

4001–4100 

|-bgcolor=#fefefe
| 4001 Ptolemaeus || 1949 PV ||  || August 2, 1949 || Heidelberg || K. Reinmuth || FLO || align=right | 4.6 km || 
|-id=002 bgcolor=#E9E9E9
| 4002 Shinagawa || 1950 JB ||  || May 14, 1950 || Heidelberg || K. Reinmuth || slow || align=right | 10 km || 
|-id=003 bgcolor=#d6d6d6
| 4003 Schumann || 1964 ED ||  || March 8, 1964 || Tautenburg Observatory || F. Börngen || 7:4 || align=right | 36 km || 
|-id=004 bgcolor=#d6d6d6
| 4004 Listʹev ||  ||  || September 16, 1971 || Nauchnij || Crimean Astrophysical Obs. || MEL || align=right | 25 km || 
|-id=005 bgcolor=#fefefe
| 4005 Dyagilev ||  ||  || October 8, 1972 || Nauchnij || L. V. Zhuravleva || V || align=right | 7.7 km || 
|-id=006 bgcolor=#E9E9E9
| 4006 Sandler || 1972 YR ||  || December 29, 1972 || Nauchnij || T. M. Smirnova || — || align=right | 16 km || 
|-id=007 bgcolor=#C2FFFF
| 4007 Euryalos || 1973 SR ||  || September 19, 1973 || Palomar || PLS || L4 || align=right | 46 km || 
|-id=008 bgcolor=#fefefe
| 4008 Corbin || 1977 BY ||  || January 22, 1977 || El Leoncito || Félix Aguilar Obs. || — || align=right | 5.4 km || 
|-id=009 bgcolor=#d6d6d6
| 4009 Drobyshevskij ||  ||  || March 13, 1977 || Nauchnij || N. S. Chernykh || THM || align=right | 18 km || 
|-id=010 bgcolor=#E9E9E9
| 4010 Nikolʹskij ||  ||  || August 21, 1977 || Nauchnij || N. S. Chernykh || — || align=right | 5.4 km || 
|-id=011 bgcolor=#fefefe
| 4011 Bakharev ||  ||  || September 28, 1978 || Nauchnij || N. S. Chernykh || — || align=right | 3.7 km || 
|-id=012 bgcolor=#fefefe
| 4012 Geballe ||  ||  || November 7, 1978 || Palomar || E. F. Helin, S. J. Bus || FLO || align=right | 5.8 km || 
|-id=013 bgcolor=#d6d6d6
| 4013 Ogiria ||  ||  || July 21, 1979 || Nauchnij || N. S. Chernykh || THM || align=right | 16 km || 
|-id=014 bgcolor=#d6d6d6
| 4014 Heizman ||  ||  || September 28, 1979 || Nauchnij || N. S. Chernykh || 7:4 || align=right | 37 km || 
|-id=015 bgcolor=#FFC2E0
| 4015 Wilson-Harrington || 1979 VA ||  || November 15, 1979 || Palomar || E. F. Helin || APO +1kmPHA || align=right | 4.0 km || 
|-id=016 bgcolor=#fefefe
| 4016 Sambre || 1979 XK ||  || December 15, 1979 || La Silla || H. Debehogne, E. R. Netto || — || align=right | 8.3 km || 
|-id=017 bgcolor=#E9E9E9
| 4017 Disneya ||  ||  || February 21, 1980 || Nauchnij || L. G. Karachkina || — || align=right | 7.3 km || 
|-id=018 bgcolor=#E9E9E9
| 4018 Bratislava || 1980 YM ||  || December 30, 1980 || Kleť || A. Mrkos || — || align=right | 12 km || 
|-id=019 bgcolor=#fefefe
| 4019 Klavetter ||  ||  || March 1, 1981 || Siding Spring || S. J. Bus || — || align=right | 3.4 km || 
|-id=020 bgcolor=#E9E9E9
| 4020 Dominique ||  ||  || March 1, 1981 || Siding Spring || S. J. Bus || — || align=right | 6.9 km || 
|-id=021 bgcolor=#fefefe
| 4021 Dancey ||  ||  || August 30, 1981 || Anderson Mesa || E. Bowell || NYS || align=right | 4.5 km || 
|-id=022 bgcolor=#fefefe
| 4022 Nonna ||  ||  || October 8, 1981 || Nauchnij || L. I. Chernykh || V || align=right | 3.7 km || 
|-id=023 bgcolor=#fefefe
| 4023 Jarník || 1981 UN ||  || October 25, 1981 || Kleť || L. Brožek || — || align=right | 5.6 km || 
|-id=024 bgcolor=#fefefe
| 4024 Ronan || 1981 WQ ||  || November 24, 1981 || Anderson Mesa || E. Bowell || slow || align=right | 12 km || 
|-id=025 bgcolor=#fefefe
| 4025 Ridley || 1981 WU ||  || November 24, 1981 || Anderson Mesa || E. Bowell || NYS || align=right | 4.4 km || 
|-id=026 bgcolor=#fefefe
| 4026 Beet ||  ||  || January 30, 1982 || Anderson Mesa || E. Bowell || NYS || align=right | 13 km || 
|-id=027 bgcolor=#fefefe
| 4027 Mitton || 1982 DN ||  || February 21, 1982 || Anderson Mesa || E. Bowell || NYS || align=right | 5.6 km || 
|-id=028 bgcolor=#E9E9E9
| 4028 Pancratz ||  ||  || February 18, 1982 || Socorro || L. G. Taff || — || align=right | 7.3 km || 
|-id=029 bgcolor=#E9E9E9
| 4029 Bridges ||  ||  || May 24, 1982 || Palomar || C. S. Shoemaker, S. J. Bus || moon || align=right | 7.4 km || 
|-id=030 bgcolor=#fefefe
| 4030 Archenhold ||  ||  || March 2, 1984 || La Silla || H. Debehogne || moon || align=right | 7.0 km || 
|-id=031 bgcolor=#fefefe
| 4031 Mueller || 1985 CL ||  || February 12, 1985 || Palomar || C. S. Shoemaker || H || align=right | 3.9 km || 
|-id=032 bgcolor=#fefefe
| 4032 Chaplygin ||  ||  || October 22, 1985 || Nauchnij || L. V. Zhuravleva || — || align=right | 4.5 km || 
|-id=033 bgcolor=#fefefe
| 4033 Yatsugatake || 1986 FA ||  || March 16, 1986 || Kobuchizawa || M. Inoue, O. Muramatsu || FLO || align=right | 4.8 km || 
|-id=034 bgcolor=#FFC2E0
| 4034 Vishnu || 1986 PA ||  || August 2, 1986 || Palomar || E. F. Helin || APOPHA || align=right data-sort-value="0.42" | 420 m || 
|-id=035 bgcolor=#C2FFFF
| 4035 Thestor || 1986 WD ||  || November 22, 1986 || Toyota || K. Suzuki, T. Urata || L4 || align=right | 69 km || 
|-id=036 bgcolor=#E9E9E9
| 4036 Whitehouse ||  ||  || February 21, 1987 || La Silla || H. Debehogne || HNA || align=right | 11 km || 
|-id=037 bgcolor=#E9E9E9
| 4037 Ikeya || 1987 EC ||  || March 2, 1987 || Toyota || K. Suzuki, T. Urata || — || align=right | 7.1 km || 
|-id=038 bgcolor=#fefefe
| 4038 Kristina ||  ||  || August 21, 1987 || La Silla || E. W. Elst || V || align=right | 4.3 km || 
|-id=039 bgcolor=#fefefe
| 4039 Souseki || 1987 SH ||  || September 17, 1987 || Geisei || T. Seki || — || align=right | 6.6 km || 
|-id=040 bgcolor=#E9E9E9
| 4040 Purcell ||  ||  || September 21, 1987 || Anderson Mesa || E. Bowell || — || align=right | 12 km || 
|-id=041 bgcolor=#d6d6d6
| 4041 Miyamotoyohko ||  ||  || February 19, 1988 || Chiyoda || T. Kojima || EOS || align=right | 26 km || 
|-id=042 bgcolor=#fefefe
| 4042 Okhotsk ||  ||  || January 15, 1989 || Kitami || K. Endate, K. Watanabe || NYS || align=right | 8.6 km || 
|-id=043 bgcolor=#d6d6d6
| 4043 Perolof || 1175 T-3 ||  || October 17, 1977 || Palomar || PLS || — || align=right | 18 km || 
|-id=044 bgcolor=#d6d6d6
| 4044 Erikhøg || 5142 T-3 ||  || October 16, 1977 || Palomar || PLS || — || align=right | 15 km || 
|-id=045 bgcolor=#d6d6d6
| 4045 Lowengrub || 1953 RG ||  || September 9, 1953 || Brooklyn || Indiana University || ALA || align=right | 31 km || 
|-id=046 bgcolor=#E9E9E9
| 4046 Swain || 1953 TV ||  || October 7, 1953 || Brooklyn || Indiana University || — || align=right | 13 km || 
|-id=047 bgcolor=#E9E9E9
| 4047 Chang'E ||  ||  || October 8, 1964 || Nanking || Purple Mountain Obs. || — || align=right | 9.6 km || 
|-id=048 bgcolor=#fefefe
| 4048 Samwestfall || 1964 UC ||  || October 30, 1964 || Brooklyn || Indiana University || — || align=right | 3.4 km || 
|-id=049 bgcolor=#d6d6d6
| 4049 Noragalʹ ||  ||  || August 31, 1973 || Nauchnij || T. M. Smirnova || — || align=right | 19 km || 
|-id=050 bgcolor=#d6d6d6
| 4050 Mebailey || 1976 SF ||  || September 20, 1976 || Kvistaberg || C.-I. Lagerkvist, H. Rickman || — || align=right | 17 km || 
|-id=051 bgcolor=#E9E9E9
| 4051 Hatanaka || 1978 VP ||  || November 1, 1978 || Caussols || K. Tomita || AGN || align=right | 7.7 km || 
|-id=052 bgcolor=#d6d6d6
| 4052 Crovisier ||  ||  || February 28, 1981 || Siding Spring || S. J. Bus || EOS || align=right | 13 km || 
|-id=053 bgcolor=#fefefe
| 4053 Cherkasov ||  ||  || October 2, 1981 || Nauchnij || L. V. Zhuravleva || — || align=right | 6.0 km || 
|-id=054 bgcolor=#d6d6d6
| 4054 Turnov || 1983 TL ||  || October 5, 1983 || Kleť || A. Mrkos || — || align=right | 12 km || 
|-id=055 bgcolor=#FFC2E0
| 4055 Magellan ||  ||  || February 24, 1985 || Palomar || E. F. Helin || AMO +1km || align=right | 2.5 km || 
|-id=056 bgcolor=#E9E9E9
| 4056 Timwarner ||  ||  || March 22, 1985 || Anderson Mesa || E. Bowell || — || align=right | 7.6 km || 
|-id=057 bgcolor=#C2FFFF
| 4057 Demophon || 1985 TQ ||  || October 15, 1985 || Anderson Mesa || E. Bowell || L4 || align=right | 46 km || 
|-id=058 bgcolor=#d6d6d6
| 4058 Cecilgreen || 1986 JV ||  || May 4, 1986 || Anderson Mesa || E. Bowell || EOS || align=right | 15 km || 
|-id=059 bgcolor=#d6d6d6
| 4059 Balder ||  ||  || September 29, 1987 || Brorfelde || P. Jensen || EOS || align=right | 17 km || 
|-id=060 bgcolor=#C2FFFF
| 4060 Deipylos ||  ||  || December 17, 1987 || La Silla || E. W. Elst, G. Pizarro || L4 || align=right | 84 km || 
|-id=061 bgcolor=#d6d6d6
| 4061 Martelli ||  ||  || March 19, 1988 || La Silla || W. Ferreri || THM || align=right | 19 km || 
|-id=062 bgcolor=#fefefe
| 4062 Schiaparelli || 1989 BF ||  || January 28, 1989 || Bologna || San Vittore Obs. || FLO || align=right | 5.5 km || 
|-id=063 bgcolor=#C2FFFF
| 4063 Euforbo ||  ||  || February 1, 1989 || Bologna || San Vittore Obs. || L4 || align=right | 96 km || 
|-id=064 bgcolor=#fefefe
| 4064 Marjorie || 2126 P-L ||  || September 24, 1960 || Palomar || PLS || — || align=right | 6.0 km || 
|-id=065 bgcolor=#fefefe
| 4065 Meinel || 2820 P-L ||  || September 24, 1960 || Palomar || PLS || FLO || align=right | 3.9 km || 
|-id=066 bgcolor=#fefefe
| 4066 Haapavesi || 1940 RG ||  || September 7, 1940 || Turku || H. Alikoski || FLO || align=right | 4.1 km || 
|-id=067 bgcolor=#E9E9E9
| 4067 Mikhelʹson || 1966 TP ||  || October 11, 1966 || Nauchnij || N. S. Chernykh || RAF || align=right | 7.4 km || 
|-id=068 bgcolor=#C2FFFF
| 4068 Menestheus || 1973 SW ||  || September 19, 1973 || Palomar || PLS || L4 || align=right | 68 km || 
|-id=069 bgcolor=#fefefe
| 4069 Blakee ||  ||  || November 7, 1978 || Palomar || E. F. Helin, S. J. Bus || — || align=right | 4.1 km || 
|-id=070 bgcolor=#fefefe
| 4070 Rozov ||  ||  || September 8, 1980 || Nauchnij || L. V. Zhuravleva || FLO || align=right | 5.2 km || 
|-id=071 bgcolor=#d6d6d6
| 4071 Rostovdon ||  ||  || September 7, 1981 || Nauchnij || L. G. Karachkina || — || align=right | 26 km || 
|-id=072 bgcolor=#fefefe
| 4072 Yayoi ||  ||  || October 30, 1981 || Kiso || H. Kosai, K. Furukawa || — || align=right | 4.7 km || 
|-id=073 bgcolor=#d6d6d6
| 4073 Ruianzhongxue ||  ||  || October 23, 1981 || Nanking || Purple Mountain Obs. || THM || align=right | 13 km || 
|-id=074 bgcolor=#d6d6d6
| 4074 Sharkov ||  ||  || October 22, 1981 || Nauchnij || N. S. Chernykh || EOS || align=right | 12 km || 
|-id=075 bgcolor=#d6d6d6
| 4075 Sviridov ||  ||  || October 14, 1982 || Nauchnij || L. G. Karachkina || — || align=right | 10 km || 
|-id=076 bgcolor=#d6d6d6
| 4076 Dörffel ||  ||  || October 19, 1982 || Tautenburg Observatory || F. Börngen || KOR || align=right | 9.0 km || 
|-id=077 bgcolor=#d6d6d6
| 4077 Asuka ||  ||  || December 13, 1982 || Kiso || H. Kosai, K. Furukawa || EOS || align=right | 19 km || 
|-id=078 bgcolor=#d6d6d6
| 4078 Polakis || 1983 AC ||  || January 9, 1983 || Anderson Mesa || B. A. Skiff || EOS || align=right | 20 km || 
|-id=079 bgcolor=#d6d6d6
| 4079 Britten || 1983 CS ||  || February 15, 1983 || Anderson Mesa || E. Bowell || THM || align=right | 16 km || 
|-id=080 bgcolor=#fefefe
| 4080 Galinskij || 1983 PW ||  || August 4, 1983 || Nauchnij || L. G. Karachkina || FLO || align=right | 5.0 km || 
|-id=081 bgcolor=#fefefe
| 4081 Tippett ||  ||  || September 14, 1983 || Anderson Mesa || E. Bowell || — || align=right | 7.6 km || 
|-id=082 bgcolor=#fefefe
| 4082 Swann ||  ||  || September 27, 1984 || Palomar || C. S. Shoemaker || — || align=right | 9.5 km || 
|-id=083 bgcolor=#E9E9E9
| 4083 Jody || 1985 CV ||  || February 12, 1985 || Palomar || C. S. Shoemaker || — || align=right | 9.6 km || 
|-id=084 bgcolor=#d6d6d6
| 4084 Hollis || 1985 GM ||  || April 14, 1985 || Anderson Mesa || E. Bowell || KOR || align=right | 10 km || 
|-id=085 bgcolor=#E9E9E9
| 4085 Weir || 1985 JR ||  || May 13, 1985 || Palomar || C. S. Shoemaker || EUN || align=right | 9.2 km || 
|-id=086 bgcolor=#C2FFFF
| 4086 Podalirius ||  ||  || November 9, 1985 || Nauchnij || L. V. Zhuravleva || L4 || align=right | 85 km || 
|-id=087 bgcolor=#fefefe
| 4087 Pärt ||  ||  || March 5, 1986 || Anderson Mesa || E. Bowell || — || align=right | 6.4 km || 
|-id=088 bgcolor=#fefefe
| 4088 Baggesen || 1986 GG ||  || April 3, 1986 || Brorfelde || P. Jensen || — || align=right | 6.5 km || 
|-id=089 bgcolor=#fefefe
| 4089 Galbraith || 1986 JG ||  || May 2, 1986 || Palomar || Palomar Obs. || — || align=right | 5.1 km || 
|-id=090 bgcolor=#fefefe
| 4090 Říšehvězd ||  ||  || September 2, 1986 || Kleť || A. Mrkos || NYS || align=right | 7.2 km || 
|-id=091 bgcolor=#d6d6d6
| 4091 Lowe ||  ||  || October 7, 1986 || Anderson Mesa || E. Bowell || — || align=right | 23 km || 
|-id=092 bgcolor=#E9E9E9
| 4092 Tyr ||  ||  || October 8, 1986 || Brorfelde || P. Jensen || moon || align=right | 9.4 km || 
|-id=093 bgcolor=#d6d6d6
| 4093 Bennett || 1986 VD ||  || November 4, 1986 || Siding Spring || R. H. McNaught || — || align=right | 25 km || 
|-id=094 bgcolor=#d6d6d6
| 4094 Aoshima || 1987 QC ||  || August 26, 1987 || Shizuoka || M. Kizawa, W. Kakei || — || align=right | 13 km || 
|-id=095 bgcolor=#fefefe
| 4095 Ishizuchisan || 1987 SG ||  || September 16, 1987 || Geisei || T. Seki || — || align=right | 4.8 km || 
|-id=096 bgcolor=#E9E9E9
| 4096 Kushiro || 1987 VC ||  || November 15, 1987 || Kushiro || S. Ueda, H. Kaneda || GEF || align=right | 7.7 km || 
|-id=097 bgcolor=#fefefe
| 4097 Tsurugisan || 1987 WW ||  || November 18, 1987 || Geisei || T. Seki || — || align=right | 4.7 km || 
|-id=098 bgcolor=#d6d6d6
| 4098 Thraen ||  ||  || November 26, 1987 || Tautenburg Observatory || F. Börngen || THM || align=right | 14 km || 
|-id=099 bgcolor=#E9E9E9
| 4099 Wiggins ||  ||  || January 13, 1988 || La Silla || H. Debehogne || MAR || align=right | 7.5 km || 
|-id=100 bgcolor=#d6d6d6
| 4100 Sumiko || 1988 BF ||  || January 16, 1988 || Okutama || T. Hioki, N. Kawasato || EOS || align=right | 16 km || 
|}

4101–4200 

|-bgcolor=#E9E9E9
| 4101 Ruikou || 1988 CE ||  || February 8, 1988 || Geisei || T. Seki || — || align=right | 8.2 km || 
|-id=102 bgcolor=#d6d6d6
| 4102 Gergana ||  ||  || October 15, 1988 || Smolyan || V. G. Ivanova || EOS || align=right | 12 km || 
|-id=103 bgcolor=#fefefe
| 4103 Chahine || 1989 EB ||  || March 4, 1989 || Palomar || E. F. Helin || — || align=right | 16 km || 
|-id=104 bgcolor=#E9E9E9
| 4104 Alu || 1989 ED ||  || March 5, 1989 || Palomar || E. F. Helin || MAR || align=right | 8.6 km || 
|-id=105 bgcolor=#E9E9E9
| 4105 Tsia || 1989 EK ||  || March 5, 1989 || Palomar || E. F. Helin || — || align=right | 13 km || 
|-id=106 bgcolor=#E9E9E9
| 4106 Nada || 1989 EW ||  || March 6, 1989 || Minami-Oda || T. Nomura, K. Kawanishi || — || align=right | 21 km || 
|-id=107 bgcolor=#E9E9E9
| 4107 Rufino || 1989 GT ||  || April 7, 1989 || Palomar || E. F. Helin || — || align=right | 13 km || 
|-id=108 bgcolor=#E9E9E9
| 4108 Rakos || 3439 T-3 ||  || October 16, 1977 || Palomar || PLS || MIS || align=right | 10 km || 
|-id=109 bgcolor=#fefefe
| 4109 Anokhin || 1969 OW ||  || July 17, 1969 || Nauchnij || B. A. Burnasheva || — || align=right | 4.8 km || 
|-id=110 bgcolor=#d6d6d6
| 4110 Keats || 1977 CZ ||  || February 13, 1977 || Palomar || E. Bowell || — || align=right | 23 km || 
|-id=111 bgcolor=#fefefe
| 4111 Lamy ||  ||  || March 1, 1981 || Siding Spring || S. J. Bus || — || align=right | 3.2 km || 
|-id=112 bgcolor=#d6d6d6
| 4112 Hrabal || 1981 ST ||  || September 25, 1981 || Kleť || M. Mahrová || — || align=right | 46 km || 
|-id=113 bgcolor=#fefefe
| 4113 Rascana || 1982 BQ ||  || January 18, 1982 || Anderson Mesa || E. Bowell || FLO || align=right | 7.3 km || 
|-id=114 bgcolor=#E9E9E9
| 4114 Jasnorzewska ||  ||  || August 19, 1982 || Kleť || Z. Vávrová || — || align=right | 5.5 km || 
|-id=115 bgcolor=#d6d6d6
| 4115 Peternorton ||  ||  || August 29, 1982 || Nauchnij || N. S. Chernykh || EOS || align=right | 14 km || 
|-id=116 bgcolor=#fefefe
| 4116 Elachi || 1982 SU ||  || September 20, 1982 || Palomar || E. F. Helin || H || align=right | 4.7 km || 
|-id=117 bgcolor=#d6d6d6
| 4117 Wilke ||  ||  || September 24, 1982 || Tautenburg Observatory || F. Börngen || — || align=right | 6.5 km || 
|-id=118 bgcolor=#d6d6d6
| 4118 Sveta ||  ||  || October 15, 1982 || Nauchnij || L. V. Zhuravleva || EOS || align=right | 13 km || 
|-id=119 bgcolor=#d6d6d6
| 4119 Miles || 1983 BE ||  || January 16, 1983 || Anderson Mesa || E. Bowell || ITH || align=right | 13 km || 
|-id=120 bgcolor=#d6d6d6
| 4120 Denoyelle ||  ||  || September 14, 1985 || La Silla || H. Debehogne || — || align=right | 15 km || 
|-id=121 bgcolor=#fefefe
| 4121 Carlin || 1986 JH ||  || May 2, 1986 || Palomar || INAS || PHO || align=right | 6.9 km || 
|-id=122 bgcolor=#E9E9E9
| 4122 Ferrari || 1986 OA ||  || July 28, 1986 || Bologna || San Vittore Obs. || — || align=right | 8.9 km || 
|-id=123 bgcolor=#d6d6d6
| 4123 Tarsila ||  ||  || August 27, 1986 || La Silla || H. Debehogne || KOR || align=right | 6.5 km || 
|-id=124 bgcolor=#E9E9E9
| 4124 Herriot || 1986 SE ||  || September 29, 1986 || Kleť || Z. Vávrová || HOF || align=right | 19 km || 
|-id=125 bgcolor=#fefefe
| 4125 Lew Allen || 1987 MO ||  || June 28, 1987 || Palomar || E. F. Helin || H || align=right | 6.4 km || 
|-id=126 bgcolor=#d6d6d6
| 4126 Mashu || 1988 BU ||  || January 19, 1988 || Kitami || K. Endate, K. Watanabe || THM || align=right | 16 km || 
|-id=127 bgcolor=#d6d6d6
| 4127 Kyogoku ||  ||  || January 25, 1988 || Kushiro || S. Ueda, H. Kaneda || — || align=right | 8.5 km || 
|-id=128 bgcolor=#E9E9E9
| 4128 UKSTU ||  ||  || January 28, 1988 || Siding Spring || R. H. McNaught || EUN || align=right | 4.5 km || 
|-id=129 bgcolor=#E9E9E9
| 4129 Richelen || 1988 DM ||  || February 22, 1988 || Siding Spring || R. H. McNaught || — || align=right | 5.4 km || 
|-id=130 bgcolor=#d6d6d6
| 4130 Ramanujan ||  ||  || February 17, 1988 || Kavalur || R. Rajamohan || EOS || align=right | 13 km || 
|-id=131 bgcolor=#d6d6d6
| 4131 Stasik ||  ||  || February 23, 1988 || Siding Spring || A. J. Noymer || — || align=right | 29 km || 
|-id=132 bgcolor=#fefefe
| 4132 Bartók || 1988 EH ||  || March 12, 1988 || Palomar || J. Alu || — || align=right | 9.7 km || 
|-id=133 bgcolor=#E9E9E9
| 4133 Heureka || 1942 DB ||  || February 17, 1942 || Turku || L. Oterma || EUN || align=right | 9.5 km || 
|-id=134 bgcolor=#fefefe
| 4134 Schütz || 1961 CR ||  || February 15, 1961 || Tautenburg Observatory || F. Börngen || FLO || align=right | 4.1 km || 
|-id=135 bgcolor=#E9E9E9
| 4135 Svetlanov || 1966 PG ||  || August 14, 1966 || Nauchnij || L. I. Chernykh, T. M. Smirnova || DOR || align=right | 24 km || 
|-id=136 bgcolor=#fefefe
| 4136 Artmane || 1968 FJ ||  || March 28, 1968 || Nauchnij || T. M. Smirnova || NYS || align=right | 11 km || 
|-id=137 bgcolor=#fefefe
| 4137 Crabtree || 1970 WC ||  || November 24, 1970 || Hamburg-Bergedorf || L. Kohoutek || — || align=right | 6.5 km || 
|-id=138 bgcolor=#C2FFFF
| 4138 Kalchas || 1973 SM ||  || September 19, 1973 || Palomar || PLS || L4 || align=right | 46 km || 
|-id=139 bgcolor=#d6d6d6
| 4139 Ulʹyanin ||  ||  || November 2, 1975 || Nauchnij || T. M. Smirnova || THM || align=right | 13 km || 
|-id=140 bgcolor=#d6d6d6
| 4140 Branham || 1976 VA ||  || November 11, 1976 || El Leoncito || Félix Aguilar Obs. || — || align=right | 34 km || 
|-id=141 bgcolor=#E9E9E9
| 4141 Nintanlena ||  ||  || August 8, 1978 || Nauchnij || N. S. Chernykh || — || align=right | 15 km || 
|-id=142 bgcolor=#FA8072
| 4142 Dersu-Uzala || 1981 KE ||  || May 28, 1981 || Kleť || Z. Vávrová || Hslow || align=right | 6.0 km || 
|-id=143 bgcolor=#d6d6d6
| 4143 Huziak ||  ||  || August 29, 1981 || Socorro || L. G. Taff || THM || align=right | 17 km || 
|-id=144 bgcolor=#d6d6d6
| 4144 Vladvasilʹev ||  ||  || September 28, 1981 || Nauchnij || L. V. Zhuravleva || — || align=right | 32 km || 
|-id=145 bgcolor=#fefefe
| 4145 Maximova ||  ||  || September 29, 1981 || Nauchnij || L. V. Zhuravleva || FLO || align=right | 5.3 km || 
|-id=146 bgcolor=#fefefe
| 4146 Rudolfinum ||  ||  || February 16, 1982 || Kleť || L. Brožek || FLO || align=right | 4.8 km || 
|-id=147 bgcolor=#fefefe
| 4147 Lennon || 1983 AY ||  || January 12, 1983 || Anderson Mesa || B. A. Skiff || Vslow? || align=right | 5.2 km || 
|-id=148 bgcolor=#fefefe
| 4148 McCartney || 1983 NT ||  || July 11, 1983 || Anderson Mesa || E. Bowell || FLO || align=right | 7.3 km || 
|-id=149 bgcolor=#E9E9E9
| 4149 Harrison || 1984 EZ ||  || March 9, 1984 || Anderson Mesa || B. A. Skiff || EUN || align=right | 10 km || 
|-id=150 bgcolor=#fefefe
| 4150 Starr ||  ||  || August 31, 1984 || Anderson Mesa || B. A. Skiff || — || align=right | 6.6 km || 
|-id=151 bgcolor=#d6d6d6
| 4151 Alanhale ||  ||  || April 24, 1985 || Palomar || C. S. Shoemaker, E. M. Shoemaker || — || align=right | 20 km || 
|-id=152 bgcolor=#d6d6d6
| 4152 Weber || 1985 JF ||  || May 15, 1985 || Anderson Mesa || E. Bowell || — || align=right | 20 km || 
|-id=153 bgcolor=#d6d6d6
| 4153 Roburnham ||  ||  || May 14, 1985 || Palomar || C. S. Shoemaker || THM || align=right | 17 km || 
|-id=154 bgcolor=#E9E9E9
| 4154 Rumsey || 1985 NE ||  || July 10, 1985 || Lake Tekapo || A. C. Gilmore, P. M. Kilmartin || — || align=right | 6.2 km || 
|-id=155 bgcolor=#fefefe
| 4155 Watanabe ||  ||  || October 25, 1987 || Kushiro || S. Ueda, H. Kaneda || — || align=right | 6.0 km || 
|-id=156 bgcolor=#E9E9E9
| 4156 Okadanoboru || 1988 BE ||  || January 16, 1988 || Chiyoda || T. Kojima || — || align=right | 15 km || 
|-id=157 bgcolor=#E9E9E9
| 4157 Izu ||  ||  || December 11, 1988 || Gekko || Y. Oshima || ADE || align=right | 21 km || 
|-id=158 bgcolor=#d6d6d6
| 4158 Santini || 1989 BE ||  || January 28, 1989 || Bologna || San Vittore Obs. || 7:4slow || align=right | 17 km || 
|-id=159 bgcolor=#E9E9E9
| 4159 Freeman || 1989 GK ||  || April 5, 1989 || Palomar || E. F. Helin || — || align=right | 17 km || 
|-id=160 bgcolor=#fefefe
| 4160 Sabrina-John || 1989 LE ||  || June 3, 1989 || Palomar || E. F. Helin || — || align=right | 7.7 km || 
|-id=161 bgcolor=#d6d6d6
| 4161 Amasis || 6627 P-L ||  || September 24, 1960 || Palomar || PLS || — || align=right | 16 km || 
|-id=162 bgcolor=#d6d6d6
| 4162 SAF || 1940 WA ||  || November 24, 1940 || Nice || A. Patry || — || align=right | 25 km || 
|-id=163 bgcolor=#d6d6d6
| 4163 Saaremaa || 1941 HC ||  || April 19, 1941 || Turku || L. Oterma || EOS || align=right | 20 km || 
|-id=164 bgcolor=#E9E9E9
| 4164 Shilov || 1969 UR ||  || October 16, 1969 || Nauchnij || L. I. Chernykh || EUN || align=right | 10 km || 
|-id=165 bgcolor=#fefefe
| 4165 Didkovskij ||  ||  || April 1, 1976 || Nauchnij || N. S. Chernykh || — || align=right | 8.0 km || 
|-id=166 bgcolor=#E9E9E9
| 4166 Pontryagin ||  ||  || September 26, 1978 || Nauchnij || L. V. Zhuravleva || — || align=right | 8.0 km || 
|-id=167 bgcolor=#E9E9E9
| 4167 Riemann ||  ||  || October 2, 1978 || Nauchnij || L. V. Zhuravleva || MAR || align=right | 13 km || 
|-id=168 bgcolor=#E9E9E9
| 4168 Millan || 1979 EE ||  || March 6, 1979 || El Leoncito || Félix Aguilar Obs. || MIT || align=right | 6.9 km || 
|-id=169 bgcolor=#d6d6d6
| 4169 Celsius ||  ||  || March 16, 1980 || La Silla || C.-I. Lagerkvist || 7:4 || align=right | 37 km || 
|-id=170 bgcolor=#d6d6d6
| 4170 Semmelweis || 1980 PT ||  || August 6, 1980 || Kleť || Z. Vávrová || EOS || align=right | 17 km || 
|-id=171 bgcolor=#fefefe
| 4171 Carrasco ||  ||  || March 23, 1982 || Palomar || C. S. Shoemaker || FLO || align=right | 4.9 km || 
|-id=172 bgcolor=#fefefe
| 4172 Rochefort ||  ||  || March 20, 1982 || La Silla || H. Debehogne || NYS || align=right | 3.4 km || 
|-id=173 bgcolor=#fefefe
| 4173 Thicksten ||  ||  || May 27, 1982 || Palomar || C. S. Shoemaker || NYS || align=right | 12 km || 
|-id=174 bgcolor=#d6d6d6
| 4174 Pikulia ||  ||  || September 16, 1982 || Nauchnij || L. I. Chernykh || THM || align=right | 22 km || 
|-id=175 bgcolor=#E9E9E9
| 4175 Billbaum || 1985 GX ||  || April 15, 1985 || Anderson Mesa || E. Bowell || — || align=right | 8.9 km || 
|-id=176 bgcolor=#d6d6d6
| 4176 Sudek || 1987 DS ||  || February 24, 1987 || Kleť || A. Mrkos || THM || align=right | 19 km || 
|-id=177 bgcolor=#d6d6d6
| 4177 Kohman ||  ||  || September 21, 1987 || Anderson Mesa || E. Bowell || 2:1J || align=right | 11 km || 
|-id=178 bgcolor=#d6d6d6
| 4178 Mimeev || 1988 EO1 ||  || March 13, 1988 || Palomar || E. F. Helin || — || align=right | 16 km || 
|-id=179 bgcolor=#FFC2E0
| 4179 Toutatis || 1989 AC ||  || January 4, 1989 || Caussols || C. Pollas || APO +1kmPHAslow || align=right | 5.4 km || 
|-id=180 bgcolor=#E9E9E9
| 4180 Anaxagoras || 6092 P-L ||  || September 24, 1960 || Palomar || PLS || — || align=right | 9.7 km || 
|-id=181 bgcolor=#E9E9E9
| 4181 Kivi ||  ||  || February 24, 1938 || Turku || Y. Väisälä || slow || align=right | 8.3 km || 
|-id=182 bgcolor=#E9E9E9
| 4182 Mount Locke || 1951 JQ ||  || May 2, 1951 || Fort Davis || McDonald Obs. || GEF || align=right | 10 km || 
|-id=183 bgcolor=#FFC2E0
| 4183 Cuno || 1959 LM ||  || June 5, 1959 || Bloemfontein || C. Hoffmeister || APO +1kmPHA || align=right | 3.7 km || 
|-id=184 bgcolor=#E9E9E9
| 4184 Berdyayev ||  ||  || October 8, 1969 || Nauchnij || L. I. Chernykh || — || align=right | 7.6 km || 
|-id=185 bgcolor=#fefefe
| 4185 Phystech || 1975 ED ||  || March 4, 1975 || Nauchnij || T. M. Smirnova || — || align=right | 6.3 km || 
|-id=186 bgcolor=#d6d6d6
| 4186 Tamashima ||  ||  || February 18, 1977 || Kiso || H. Kosai, K. Furukawa || — || align=right | 30 km || 
|-id=187 bgcolor=#d6d6d6
| 4187 Shulnazaria ||  ||  || April 11, 1978 || Nauchnij || N. S. Chernykh || THM || align=right | 14 km || 
|-id=188 bgcolor=#fefefe
| 4188 Kitezh ||  ||  || April 25, 1979 || Nauchnij || N. S. Chernykh || — || align=right | 6.6 km || 
|-id=189 bgcolor=#fefefe
| 4189 Sayany ||  ||  || September 22, 1979 || Nauchnij || N. S. Chernykh || V || align=right | 3.9 km || 
|-id=190 bgcolor=#E9E9E9
| 4190 Kvasnica || 1980 JH ||  || May 11, 1980 || Kleť || L. Brožek || — || align=right | 7.4 km || 
|-id=191 bgcolor=#E9E9E9
| 4191 Assesse || 1980 KH ||  || May 22, 1980 || La Silla || H. Debehogne || EUN || align=right | 7.4 km || 
|-id=192 bgcolor=#d6d6d6
| 4192 Breysacher || 1981 DH ||  || February 28, 1981 || La Silla || H. Debehogne, G. DeSanctis || THM || align=right | 21 km || 
|-id=193 bgcolor=#d6d6d6
| 4193 Salanave ||  ||  || September 26, 1981 || Anderson Mesa || B. A. Skiff, N. G. Thomas || THM || align=right | 18 km || 
|-id=194 bgcolor=#E9E9E9
| 4194 Sweitzer || 1982 RE ||  || September 15, 1982 || Anderson Mesa || E. Bowell || — || align=right | 17 km || 
|-id=195 bgcolor=#d6d6d6
| 4195 Esambaev ||  ||  || September 19, 1982 || Nauchnij || L. I. Chernykh || KOR || align=right | 10 km || 
|-id=196 bgcolor=#d6d6d6
| 4196 Shuya ||  ||  || September 16, 1982 || Nauchnij || L. I. Chernykh || 3:2 || align=right | 37 km || 
|-id=197 bgcolor=#FFC2E0
| 4197 Morpheus || 1982 TA ||  || October 11, 1982 || Palomar || E. F. Helin, E. M. Shoemaker || APO +1km || align=right | 1.8 km || 
|-id=198 bgcolor=#d6d6d6
| 4198 Panthera ||  ||  || February 11, 1983 || Anderson Mesa || N. G. Thomas || THM || align=right | 12 km || 
|-id=199 bgcolor=#fefefe
| 4199 Andreev ||  ||  || September 1, 1983 || La Silla || H. Debehogne || — || align=right | 5.6 km || 
|-id=200 bgcolor=#E9E9E9
| 4200 Shizukagozen || 1983 WA ||  || November 28, 1983 || Karasuyama || Y. Banno, T. Urata || CLO || align=right | 9.4 km || 
|}

4201–4300 

|-bgcolor=#d6d6d6
| 4201 Orosz ||  ||  || May 3, 1984 || Anderson Mesa || B. A. Skiff || — || align=right | 33 km || 
|-id=202 bgcolor=#d6d6d6
| 4202 Minitti ||  ||  || February 12, 1985 || La Silla || H. Debehogne || — || align=right | 24 km || 
|-id=203 bgcolor=#E9E9E9
| 4203 Brucato ||  ||  || March 26, 1985 || Palomar || C. S. Shoemaker || BRU || align=right | 18 km || 
|-id=204 bgcolor=#fefefe
| 4204 Barsig ||  ||  || May 11, 1985 || Palomar || C. S. Shoemaker || FLO || align=right | 5.8 km || 
|-id=205 bgcolor=#FA8072
| 4205 David Hughes || 1985 YP ||  || December 18, 1985 || Anderson Mesa || E. Bowell || — || align=right | 3.7 km || 
|-id=206 bgcolor=#d6d6d6
| 4206 Verulamium || 1986 QL ||  || August 25, 1986 || La Silla || H. Debehogne || KOR || align=right | 8.5 km || 
|-id=207 bgcolor=#d6d6d6
| 4207 Chernova ||  ||  || September 5, 1986 || Anderson Mesa || E. Bowell || EOS || align=right | 13 km || 
|-id=208 bgcolor=#d6d6d6
| 4208 Kiselev ||  ||  || September 6, 1986 || Anderson Mesa || E. Bowell || URS || align=right | 30 km || 
|-id=209 bgcolor=#d6d6d6
| 4209 Briggs ||  ||  || October 4, 1986 || Palomar || E. F. Helin || ALA || align=right | 31 km || 
|-id=210 bgcolor=#d6d6d6
| 4210 Isobelthompson ||  ||  || February 21, 1987 || La Silla || H. Debehogne || EOS || align=right | 10 km || 
|-id=211 bgcolor=#d6d6d6
| 4211 Rosniblett || 1987 RT ||  || September 12, 1987 || La Silla || H. Debehogne || THM || align=right | 25 km || 
|-id=212 bgcolor=#d6d6d6
| 4212 Sansyu-Asuke ||  ||  || September 28, 1987 || Toyota || K. Suzuki, T. Urata || — || align=right | 17 km || 
|-id=213 bgcolor=#fefefe
| 4213 Njord ||  ||  || September 25, 1987 || Brorfelde || P. Jensen || — || align=right | 5.9 km || 
|-id=214 bgcolor=#fefefe
| 4214 Veralynn ||  ||  || October 22, 1987 || Nauchnij || L. V. Zhuravleva || — || align=right | 8.2 km || 
|-id=215 bgcolor=#fefefe
| 4215 Kamo ||  ||  || November 14, 1987 || Kushiro || S. Ueda, H. Kaneda || V || align=right | 6.6 km || 
|-id=216 bgcolor=#fefefe
| 4216 Neunkirchen ||  ||  || January 14, 1988 || La Silla || H. Debehogne || — || align=right | 2.4 km || 
|-id=217 bgcolor=#fefefe
| 4217 Engelhardt ||  ||  || January 24, 1988 || Palomar || C. S. Shoemaker || — || align=right | 8.7 km || 
|-id=218 bgcolor=#fefefe
| 4218 Demottoni ||  ||  || January 16, 1988 || La Silla || H. Debehogne || FLO || align=right | 4.2 km || 
|-id=219 bgcolor=#fefefe
| 4219 Nakamura || 1988 DB ||  || February 19, 1988 || Kobuchizawa || M. Inoue, O. Muramatsu || NYSslow || align=right | 10 km || 
|-id=220 bgcolor=#E9E9E9
| 4220 Flood || 1988 DN ||  || February 22, 1988 || Siding Spring || R. H. McNaught || DOR || align=right | 11 km || 
|-id=221 bgcolor=#E9E9E9
| 4221 Picasso || 1988 EJ ||  || March 13, 1988 || Palomar || J. Alu || GER || align=right | 11 km || 
|-id=222 bgcolor=#FA8072
| 4222 Nancita ||  ||  || March 13, 1988 || Palomar || E. F. Helin || — || align=right | 9.6 km || 
|-id=223 bgcolor=#d6d6d6
| 4223 Shikoku || 1988 JM ||  || May 7, 1988 || Geisei || T. Seki || EOS || align=right | 23 km || 
|-id=224 bgcolor=#d6d6d6
| 4224 Susa || 1988 KG ||  || May 19, 1988 || Palomar || E. F. Helin || — || align=right | 35 km || 
|-id=225 bgcolor=#fefefe
| 4225 Hobart || 1989 BN ||  || January 31, 1989 || Okutama || T. Hioki, N. Kawasato || — || align=right | 6.4 km || 
|-id=226 bgcolor=#d6d6d6
| 4226 Damiaan || 1989 RE ||  || September 1, 1989 || Haute-Provence || E. W. Elst || — || align=right | 33 km || 
|-id=227 bgcolor=#fefefe
| 4227 Kaali || 1942 DC ||  || February 17, 1942 || Turku || L. Oterma || NYS || align=right | 4.8 km || 
|-id=228 bgcolor=#fefefe
| 4228 Nemiro ||  ||  || July 25, 1968 || Cerro El Roble || G. A. Plyugin, Yu. A. Belyaev || — || align=right | 3.5 km || 
|-id=229 bgcolor=#fefefe
| 4229 Plevitskaya || 1971 BK ||  || January 22, 1971 || Nauchnij || L. I. Chernykh || ERI || align=right | 8.7 km || 
|-id=230 bgcolor=#d6d6d6
| 4230 van den Bergh ||  ||  || September 19, 1973 || Palomar || PLS || SHU3:2 || align=right | 28 km || 
|-id=231 bgcolor=#fefefe
| 4231 Fireman || 1976 WD ||  || November 20, 1976 || Harvard Observatory || Harvard Obs. || — || align=right | 13 km || 
|-id=232 bgcolor=#fefefe
| 4232 Aparicio || 1977 CD ||  || February 13, 1977 || El Leoncito || Félix Aguilar Obs. || H || align=right | 3.3 km || 
|-id=233 bgcolor=#fefefe
| 4233 Palʹchikov ||  ||  || September 11, 1977 || Nauchnij || N. S. Chernykh || — || align=right | 5.1 km || 
|-id=234 bgcolor=#d6d6d6
| 4234 Evtushenko ||  ||  || May 6, 1978 || Nauchnij || N. S. Chernykh || THM || align=right | 16 km || 
|-id=235 bgcolor=#d6d6d6
| 4235 Tatishchev ||  ||  || September 27, 1978 || Nauchnij || L. I. Chernykh || — || align=right | 10 km || 
|-id=236 bgcolor=#d6d6d6
| 4236 Lidov ||  ||  || March 23, 1979 || Nauchnij || N. S. Chernykh || 7:4 || align=right | 33 km || 
|-id=237 bgcolor=#E9E9E9
| 4237 Raushenbakh ||  ||  || September 24, 1979 || Nauchnij || N. S. Chernykh || — || align=right | 10 km || 
|-id=238 bgcolor=#fefefe
| 4238 Audrey || 1980 GF ||  || April 13, 1980 || Kleť || A. Mrkos || — || align=right | 5.7 km || 
|-id=239 bgcolor=#fefefe
| 4239 Goodman || 1980 OE ||  || July 17, 1980 || Anderson Mesa || E. Bowell || — || align=right | 4.4 km || 
|-id=240 bgcolor=#d6d6d6
| 4240 Grün ||  ||  || March 2, 1981 || Siding Spring || S. J. Bus || KOR || align=right | 6.6 km || 
|-id=241 bgcolor=#d6d6d6
| 4241 Pappalardo ||  ||  || March 2, 1981 || Siding Spring || S. J. Bus || — || align=right | 5.9 km || 
|-id=242 bgcolor=#d6d6d6
| 4242 Brecher || 1981 FQ ||  || March 28, 1981 || Harvard Observatory || Harvard Obs. || THM || align=right | 14 km || 
|-id=243 bgcolor=#d6d6d6
| 4243 Nankivell ||  ||  || April 4, 1981 || Lake Tekapo || A. C. Gilmore, P. M. Kilmartin || EOS || align=right | 18 km || 
|-id=244 bgcolor=#d6d6d6
| 4244 Zakharchenko ||  ||  || October 7, 1981 || Nauchnij || L. I. Chernykh || — || align=right | 15 km || 
|-id=245 bgcolor=#fefefe
| 4245 Nairc ||  ||  || October 29, 1981 || Nanking || Purple Mountain Obs. || — || align=right | 10 km || 
|-id=246 bgcolor=#fefefe
| 4246 Telemann ||  ||  || September 24, 1982 || Tautenburg Observatory || F. Börngen || — || align=right | 4.8 km || 
|-id=247 bgcolor=#d6d6d6
| 4247 Grahamsmith || 1983 WC ||  || November 28, 1983 || Anderson Mesa || E. Bowell || — || align=right | 12 km || 
|-id=248 bgcolor=#fefefe
| 4248 Ranald || 1984 HX ||  || April 23, 1984 || Lake Tekapo || A. C. Gilmore, P. M. Kilmartin || V || align=right | 4.1 km || 
|-id=249 bgcolor=#d6d6d6
| 4249 Křemže ||  ||  || September 29, 1984 || Kleť || A. Mrkos || — || align=right | 18 km || 
|-id=250 bgcolor=#d6d6d6
| 4250 Perun || 1984 UG ||  || October 20, 1984 || Kleť || Z. Vávrová || — || align=right | 23 km || 
|-id=251 bgcolor=#fefefe
| 4251 Kavasch ||  ||  || May 11, 1985 || Palomar || C. S. Shoemaker || NYS || align=right | 4.3 km || 
|-id=252 bgcolor=#E9E9E9
| 4252 Godwin ||  ||  || September 11, 1985 || La Silla || H. Debehogne || — || align=right | 7.4 km || 
|-id=253 bgcolor=#E9E9E9
| 4253 Märker ||  ||  || October 11, 1985 || Palomar || C. S. Shoemaker || — || align=right | 7.2 km || 
|-id=254 bgcolor=#E9E9E9
| 4254 Kamél ||  ||  || October 24, 1985 || Kvistaberg || C.-I. Lagerkvist || EUN || align=right | 9.6 km || 
|-id=255 bgcolor=#d6d6d6
| 4255 Spacewatch || 1986 GW ||  || April 4, 1986 || Kitt Peak || Spacewatch || SHU3:2 || align=right | 15 km || 
|-id=256 bgcolor=#fefefe
| 4256 Kagamigawa || 1986 TX ||  || October 3, 1986 || Geisei || T. Seki || — || align=right | 7.6 km || 
|-id=257 bgcolor=#FFC2E0
| 4257 Ubasti || 1987 QA ||  || August 23, 1987 || Palomar || J. E. Mueller || APO +1km || align=right | 2.4 km || 
|-id=258 bgcolor=#d6d6d6
| 4258 Ryazanov ||  ||  || September 1, 1987 || Nauchnij || L. G. Karachkina || — || align=right | 9.2 km || 
|-id=259 bgcolor=#d6d6d6
| 4259 McCoy ||  ||  || September 16, 1988 || Cerro Tololo || S. J. Bus || KOR || align=right | 9.2 km || 
|-id=260 bgcolor=#d6d6d6
| 4260 Yanai || 1989 AX ||  || January 4, 1989 || Kushiro || S. Ueda, H. Kaneda || KOR || align=right | 11 km || 
|-id=261 bgcolor=#E9E9E9
| 4261 Gekko || 1989 BJ ||  || January 28, 1989 || Gekko || Y. Oshima || AGN || align=right | 6.7 km || 
|-id=262 bgcolor=#fefefe
| 4262 DeVorkin || 1989 CO ||  || February 5, 1989 || Yorii || M. Arai, H. Mori || — || align=right | 6.4 km || 
|-id=263 bgcolor=#fefefe
| 4263 Abashiri ||  ||  || September 7, 1989 || Kitami || M. Yanai, K. Watanabe || FLO || align=right | 9.0 km || 
|-id=264 bgcolor=#fefefe
| 4264 Karljosephine || 1989 TB ||  || October 2, 1989 || Siding Spring || K. F. J. Cwach || — || align=right | 4.5 km || 
|-id=265 bgcolor=#fefefe
| 4265 Kani || 1989 TX ||  || October 8, 1989 || Kani || Y. Mizuno, T. Furuta || — || align=right | 14 km || 
|-id=266 bgcolor=#d6d6d6
| 4266 Waltari || 1940 YE ||  || December 28, 1940 || Turku || Y. Väisälä || — || align=right | 23 km || 
|-id=267 bgcolor=#fefefe
| 4267 Basner || 1971 QP ||  || August 18, 1971 || Nauchnij || T. M. Smirnova || — || align=right | 2.7 km || 
|-id=268 bgcolor=#E9E9E9
| 4268 Grebenikov ||  ||  || October 5, 1972 || Nauchnij || T. M. Smirnova || — || align=right | 4.3 km || 
|-id=269 bgcolor=#fefefe
| 4269 Bogado || 1974 FN ||  || March 22, 1974 || Cerro El Roble || C. Torres || FLO || align=right | 5.1 km || 
|-id=270 bgcolor=#fefefe
| 4270 Juanvictoria ||  ||  || October 1, 1975 || El Leoncito || Félix Aguilar Obs. || — || align=right | 8.3 km || 
|-id=271 bgcolor=#d6d6d6
| 4271 Novosibirsk ||  ||  || April 3, 1976 || Nauchnij || N. S. Chernykh || EOS || align=right | 17 km || 
|-id=272 bgcolor=#fefefe
| 4272 Entsuji ||  ||  || March 12, 1977 || Kiso || H. Kosai, K. Furukawa || moon || align=right | 7.7 km || 
|-id=273 bgcolor=#fefefe
| 4273 Dunhuang ||  ||  || October 29, 1978 || Nanking || Purple Mountain Obs. || NYS || align=right | 4.5 km || 
|-id=274 bgcolor=#E9E9E9
| 4274 Karamanov ||  ||  || September 6, 1980 || Nauchnij || N. S. Chernykh || — || align=right | 13 km || 
|-id=275 bgcolor=#E9E9E9
| 4275 Bogustafson ||  ||  || March 1, 1981 || Siding Spring || S. J. Bus || — || align=right | 3.8 km || 
|-id=276 bgcolor=#FA8072
| 4276 Clifford || 1981 XA ||  || December 2, 1981 || Anderson Mesa || E. Bowell || — || align=right | 4.7 km || 
|-id=277 bgcolor=#E9E9E9
| 4277 Holubov || 1982 AF ||  || January 15, 1982 || Kleť || A. Mrkos || — || align=right | 10 km || 
|-id=278 bgcolor=#fefefe
| 4278 Harvey || 1982 SF ||  || September 22, 1982 || Anderson Mesa || E. Bowell || FLO || align=right | 4.3 km || 
|-id=279 bgcolor=#fefefe
| 4279 De Gasparis || 1982 WB ||  || November 19, 1982 || Bologna || San Vittore Obs. || ERI || align=right | 7.6 km || 
|-id=280 bgcolor=#fefefe
| 4280 Simonenko ||  ||  || August 13, 1985 || Nauchnij || N. S. Chernykh || — || align=right | 5.9 km || 
|-id=281 bgcolor=#fefefe
| 4281 Pounds ||  ||  || October 15, 1985 || Anderson Mesa || E. Bowell || — || align=right | 9.7 km || 
|-id=282 bgcolor=#fefefe
| 4282 Endate ||  ||  || October 28, 1987 || Kushiro || S. Ueda, H. Kaneda || — || align=right | 7.4 km || 
|-id=283 bgcolor=#fefefe
| 4283 Stöffler || 1988 BZ ||  || January 23, 1988 || Palomar || C. S. Shoemaker || PHOslow? || align=right | 7.0 km || 
|-id=284 bgcolor=#fefefe
| 4284 Kaho ||  ||  || March 16, 1988 || Kushiro || S. Ueda, H. Kaneda || — || align=right | 11 km || 
|-id=285 bgcolor=#E9E9E9
| 4285 Hulkower || 1988 NH ||  || July 11, 1988 || Palomar || E. F. Helin || — || align=right | 7.8 km || 
|-id=286 bgcolor=#d6d6d6
| 4286 Rubtsov ||  ||  || August 8, 1988 || Nauchnij || L. I. Chernykh || KOR || align=right | 10 km || 
|-id=287 bgcolor=#fefefe
| 4287 Třísov ||  ||  || September 7, 1989 || Kleť || A. Mrkos || FLO || align=right | 5.9 km || 
|-id=288 bgcolor=#E9E9E9
| 4288 Tokyotech ||  ||  || October 8, 1989 || Chiyoda || T. Kojima || EUNmoon || align=right | 12 km || 
|-id=289 bgcolor=#fefefe
| 4289 Biwako ||  ||  || October 29, 1989 || Dynic || A. Sugie || FLO || align=right | 7.7 km || 
|-id=290 bgcolor=#d6d6d6
| 4290 Heisei ||  ||  || October 30, 1989 || Geisei || T. Seki || EOS || align=right | 17 km || 
|-id=291 bgcolor=#d6d6d6
| 4291 Kodaihasu || 1989 VH ||  || November 2, 1989 || Yorii || M. Arai, H. Mori || — || align=right | 18 km || 
|-id=292 bgcolor=#E9E9E9
| 4292 Aoba || 1989 VO ||  || November 4, 1989 || Ayashi Station || M. Koishikawa || — || align=right | 25 km || 
|-id=293 bgcolor=#E9E9E9
| 4293 Masumi || 1989 VT ||  || November 1, 1989 || Gekko || Y. Oshima || — || align=right | 16 km || 
|-id=294 bgcolor=#E9E9E9
| 4294 Horatius || 4016 P-L ||  || September 24, 1960 || Palomar || PLS || — || align=right | 8.5 km || 
|-id=295 bgcolor=#fefefe
| 4295 Wisse || 6032 P-L ||  || September 24, 1960 || Palomar || PLS || — || align=right | 8.0 km || 
|-id=296 bgcolor=#fefefe
| 4296 van Woerkom ||  ||  || September 28, 1935 || Johannesburg || H. van Gent || FLOmoon || align=right | 5.3 km || 
|-id=297 bgcolor=#fefefe
| 4297 Eichhorn || 1938 HE ||  || April 19, 1938 || Hamburg-Bergedorf || W. Dieckvoß || FLO || align=right | 3.7 km || 
|-id=298 bgcolor=#d6d6d6
| 4298 Jorgenúnez || 1941 WA ||  || November 17, 1941 || Barcelona || I. Pòlit || — || align=right | 17 km || 
|-id=299 bgcolor=#fefefe
| 4299 WIYN || 1952 QX ||  || August 28, 1952 || Brooklyn || Indiana University || FLO || align=right | 7.9 km || 
|-id=300 bgcolor=#fefefe
| 4300 Marg Edmondson ||  ||  || September 18, 1955 || Brooklyn || Indiana University || — || align=right | 4.0 km || 
|}

4301–4400 

|-bgcolor=#d6d6d6
| 4301 Boyden || 1966 PM ||  || August 7, 1966 || Bloemfontein || Boyden Obs. || THM || align=right | 14 km || 
|-id=302 bgcolor=#fefefe
| 4302 Markeev || 1968 HP ||  || April 22, 1968 || Nauchnij || T. M. Smirnova || — || align=right | 7.5 km || 
|-id=303 bgcolor=#fefefe
| 4303 Savitskij ||  ||  || September 25, 1973 || Nauchnij || L. V. Zhuravleva || — || align=right | 4.1 km || 
|-id=304 bgcolor=#fefefe
| 4304 Geichenko ||  ||  || September 27, 1973 || Nauchnij || L. I. Chernykh || — || align=right | 8.4 km || 
|-id=305 bgcolor=#d6d6d6
| 4305 Clapton || 1976 EC ||  || March 7, 1976 || Harvard Observatory || Harvard Obs. || — || align=right | 7.9 km || 
|-id=306 bgcolor=#d6d6d6
| 4306 Dunaevskij ||  ||  || September 24, 1976 || Nauchnij || N. S. Chernykh || THM || align=right | 9.4 km || 
|-id=307 bgcolor=#fefefe
| 4307 Cherepashchuk ||  ||  || October 26, 1976 || Nauchnij || T. M. Smirnova || — || align=right | 7.1 km || 
|-id=308 bgcolor=#E9E9E9
| 4308 Magarach ||  ||  || August 9, 1978 || Nauchnij || N. S. Chernykh || EUN || align=right | 9.5 km || 
|-id=309 bgcolor=#d6d6d6
| 4309 Marvin || 1978 QC ||  || August 30, 1978 || Harvard Observatory || Harvard Obs. || — || align=right | 5.5 km || 
|-id=310 bgcolor=#fefefe
| 4310 Strömholm ||  ||  || September 2, 1978 || La Silla || C.-I. Lagerkvist || — || align=right | 3.6 km || 
|-id=311 bgcolor=#fefefe
| 4311 Zguridi ||  ||  || September 26, 1978 || Nauchnij || L. V. Zhuravleva || V || align=right | 4.0 km || 
|-id=312 bgcolor=#fefefe
| 4312 Knacke ||  ||  || November 29, 1978 || Palomar || S. J. Bus, C. T. Kowal || — || align=right | 12 km || 
|-id=313 bgcolor=#E9E9E9
| 4313 Bouchet ||  ||  || April 21, 1979 || La Silla || H. Debehogne || — || align=right | 19 km || 
|-id=314 bgcolor=#E9E9E9
| 4314 Dervan ||  ||  || June 25, 1979 || Siding Spring || E. F. Helin, S. J. Bus || — || align=right | 5.8 km || 
|-id=315 bgcolor=#d6d6d6
| 4315 Pronik ||  ||  || September 24, 1979 || Nauchnij || N. S. Chernykh || — || align=right | 21 km || 
|-id=316 bgcolor=#d6d6d6
| 4316 Babinkova ||  ||  || October 14, 1979 || Nauchnij || N. S. Chernykh || KOR || align=right | 9.7 km || 
|-id=317 bgcolor=#d6d6d6
| 4317 Garibaldi ||  ||  || February 19, 1980 || Kleť || Z. Vávrová || HIL3:2 || align=right | 39 km || 
|-id=318 bgcolor=#d6d6d6
| 4318 Baťa ||  ||  || February 21, 1980 || Kleť || Z. Vávrová || — || align=right | 26 km || 
|-id=319 bgcolor=#fefefe
| 4319 Jackierobinson ||  ||  || March 1, 1981 || Siding Spring || S. J. Bus || — || align=right | 4.1 km || 
|-id=320 bgcolor=#fefefe
| 4320 Jarosewich ||  ||  || March 1, 1981 || Siding Spring || S. J. Bus || — || align=right | 2.7 km || 
|-id=321 bgcolor=#d6d6d6
| 4321 Zero ||  ||  || March 2, 1981 || Siding Spring || S. J. Bus || — || align=right | 11 km || 
|-id=322 bgcolor=#fefefe
| 4322 Billjackson ||  ||  || March 11, 1981 || Siding Spring || S. J. Bus || FLO || align=right | 3.7 km || 
|-id=323 bgcolor=#fefefe
| 4323 Hortulus || 1981 QN ||  || August 27, 1981 || Zimmerwald || P. Wild || FLO || align=right | 4.0 km || 
|-id=324 bgcolor=#E9E9E9
| 4324 Bickel ||  ||  || December 24, 1981 || Socorro || L. G. Taff || — || align=right | 12 km || 
|-id=325 bgcolor=#E9E9E9
| 4325 Guest || 1982 HL ||  || April 18, 1982 || Anderson Mesa || E. Bowell || MRX || align=right | 9.2 km || 
|-id=326 bgcolor=#d6d6d6
| 4326 McNally ||  ||  || April 28, 1982 || Anderson Mesa || E. Bowell || — || align=right | 16 km || 
|-id=327 bgcolor=#E9E9E9
| 4327 Ries ||  ||  || May 24, 1982 || Palomar || C. S. Shoemaker || slow || align=right | 15 km || 
|-id=328 bgcolor=#fefefe
| 4328 Valina ||  ||  || September 18, 1982 || La Silla || H. Debehogne || — || align=right | 3.5 km || 
|-id=329 bgcolor=#fefefe
| 4329 Miró ||  ||  || September 22, 1982 || Socorro || L. G. Taff || — || align=right | 5.5 km || 
|-id=330 bgcolor=#fefefe
| 4330 Vivaldi ||  ||  || October 19, 1982 || Tautenburg Observatory || F. Börngen || — || align=right | 2.5 km || 
|-id=331 bgcolor=#fefefe
| 4331 Hubbard || 1983 HC ||  || April 18, 1983 || Anderson Mesa || N. G. Thomas || — || align=right | 6.0 km || 
|-id=332 bgcolor=#E9E9E9
| 4332 Milton || 1983 RC ||  || September 5, 1983 || Palomar || C. S. Shoemaker || — || align=right | 12 km || 
|-id=333 bgcolor=#fefefe
| 4333 Sinton ||  ||  || September 4, 1983 || Anderson Mesa || E. Bowell || — || align=right | 4.1 km || 
|-id=334 bgcolor=#d6d6d6
| 4334 Foo ||  ||  || September 2, 1983 || La Silla || H. Debehogne || THM || align=right | 12 km || 
|-id=335 bgcolor=#fefefe
| 4335 Verona ||  ||  || November 1, 1983 || Cavriana || Cavriana Obs. || — || align=right | 5.2 km || 
|-id=336 bgcolor=#fefefe
| 4336 Jasniewicz ||  ||  || August 31, 1984 || Anderson Mesa || B. A. Skiff || — || align=right | 5.6 km || 
|-id=337 bgcolor=#d6d6d6
| 4337 Arecibo || 1985 GB ||  || April 14, 1985 || Anderson Mesa || E. Bowell || THMmoon || align=right | 20 km || 
|-id=338 bgcolor=#fefefe
| 4338 Velez ||  ||  || August 14, 1985 || Anderson Mesa || E. Bowell || FLO || align=right | 4.0 km || 
|-id=339 bgcolor=#fefefe
| 4339 Almamater || 1985 UK ||  || October 20, 1985 || Kleť || A. Mrkos || — || align=right | 4.2 km || 
|-id=340 bgcolor=#fefefe
| 4340 Dence || 1986 JZ ||  || May 4, 1986 || Palomar || C. S. Shoemaker || — || align=right | 8.1 km || 
|-id=341 bgcolor=#FFC2E0
| 4341 Poseidon || 1987 KF ||  || May 29, 1987 || Palomar || C. S. Shoemaker || APO +1km || align=right | 3.2 km || 
|-id=342 bgcolor=#E9E9E9
| 4342 Freud ||  ||  || August 21, 1987 || La Silla || E. W. Elst || — || align=right | 19 km || 
|-id=343 bgcolor=#E9E9E9
| 4343 Tetsuya || 1988 AC ||  || January 10, 1988 || Kushiro || S. Ueda, H. Kaneda || DOR || align=right | 18 km || 
|-id=344 bgcolor=#d6d6d6
| 4344 Buxtehude ||  ||  || February 11, 1988 || La Silla || E. W. Elst || THM || align=right | 16 km || 
|-id=345 bgcolor=#d6d6d6
| 4345 Rachmaninoff ||  ||  || February 11, 1988 || La Silla || E. W. Elst || KOR || align=right | 9.5 km || 
|-id=346 bgcolor=#d6d6d6
| 4346 Whitney ||  ||  || February 23, 1988 || Siding Spring || A. J. Noymer || — || align=right | 11 km || 
|-id=347 bgcolor=#d6d6d6
| 4347 Reger ||  ||  || August 13, 1988 || Tautenburg Observatory || F. Börngen || — || align=right | 17 km || 
|-id=348 bgcolor=#C2FFFF
| 4348 Poulydamas || 1988 RU ||  || September 11, 1988 || Palomar || C. S. Shoemaker || L5 || align=right | 82 km || 
|-id=349 bgcolor=#E9E9E9
| 4349 Tibúrcio || 1989 LX ||  || June 5, 1989 || La Silla || W. Landgraf || — || align=right | 28 km || 
|-id=350 bgcolor=#E9E9E9
| 4350 Shibecha ||  ||  || October 26, 1989 || Kushiro || S. Ueda, H. Kaneda || JUN || align=right | 11 km || 
|-id=351 bgcolor=#d6d6d6
| 4351 Nobuhisa ||  ||  || October 28, 1989 || Kani || Y. Mizuno, T. Furuta || KOR || align=right | 8.3 km || 
|-id=352 bgcolor=#E9E9E9
| 4352 Kyoto ||  ||  || October 29, 1989 || Dynic || A. Sugie || — || align=right | 12 km || 
|-id=353 bgcolor=#fefefe
| 4353 Onizaki ||  ||  || November 25, 1989 || Kani || Y. Mizuno, T. Furuta || — || align=right | 11 km || 
|-id=354 bgcolor=#E9E9E9
| 4354 Euclides || 2142 P-L ||  || September 24, 1960 || Palomar || PLS || DOR || align=right | 12 km || 
|-id=355 bgcolor=#E9E9E9
| 4355 Memphis || 3524 P-L ||  || October 17, 1960 || Palomar || PLS || — || align=right | 7.8 km || 
|-id=356 bgcolor=#E9E9E9
| 4356 Marathon || 9522 P-L ||  || October 17, 1960 || Palomar || PLS || DOR || align=right | 11 km || 
|-id=357 bgcolor=#d6d6d6
| 4357 Korinthos || 2069 T-2 ||  || September 29, 1973 || Palomar || PLS || EOS || align=right | 18 km || 
|-id=358 bgcolor=#E9E9E9
| 4358 Lynn || A909 TF ||  || October 5, 1909 || Greenwich || P. H. Cowell || EUN || align=right | 9.1 km || 
|-id=359 bgcolor=#fefefe
| 4359 Berlage || 1935 TG ||  || September 28, 1935 || Johannesburg || H. van Gent || — || align=right | 5.1 km || 
|-id=360 bgcolor=#E9E9E9
| 4360 Xuyi ||  ||  || October 9, 1964 || Nanking || Purple Mountain Obs. || — || align=right | 13 km || 
|-id=361 bgcolor=#d6d6d6
| 4361 Nezhdanova ||  ||  || October 9, 1977 || Nauchnij || L. I. Chernykh || THM || align=right | 17 km || 
|-id=362 bgcolor=#fefefe
| 4362 Carlisle ||  ||  || August 1, 1978 || Bickley || Perth Obs. || FLOmoon || align=right | 5.6 km || 
|-id=363 bgcolor=#fefefe
| 4363 Sergej ||  ||  || October 2, 1978 || Nauchnij || L. V. Zhuravleva || — || align=right | 4.9 km || 
|-id=364 bgcolor=#fefefe
| 4364 Shkodrov ||  ||  || November 7, 1978 || Palomar || E. F. Helin, S. J. Bus || — || align=right | 4.2 km || 
|-id=365 bgcolor=#d6d6d6
| 4365 Ivanova ||  ||  || November 7, 1978 || Palomar || E. F. Helin, S. J. Bus || KOR || align=right | 7.4 km || 
|-id=366 bgcolor=#d6d6d6
| 4366 Venikagan ||  ||  || December 24, 1979 || Nauchnij || L. V. Zhuravleva || THM || align=right | 16 km || 
|-id=367 bgcolor=#d6d6d6
| 4367 Meech ||  ||  || March 2, 1981 || Siding Spring || S. J. Bus || — || align=right | 15 km || 
|-id=368 bgcolor=#d6d6d6
| 4368 Pillmore ||  ||  || May 5, 1981 || Palomar || C. S. Shoemaker || ALA || align=right | 22 km || 
|-id=369 bgcolor=#E9E9E9
| 4369 Seifert || 1982 OR ||  || July 30, 1982 || Kleť || L. Brožek || — || align=right | 16 km || 
|-id=370 bgcolor=#fefefe
| 4370 Dickens || 1982 SL ||  || September 22, 1982 || Anderson Mesa || E. Bowell || — || align=right | 3.8 km || 
|-id=371 bgcolor=#fefefe
| 4371 Fyodorov ||  ||  || April 10, 1983 || Nauchnij || L. I. Chernykh || — || align=right | 5.6 km || 
|-id=372 bgcolor=#d6d6d6
| 4372 Quincy || 1984 TB ||  || October 3, 1984 || Harvard Observatory || Oak Ridge Observatory || KOR || align=right | 8.3 km || 
|-id=373 bgcolor=#fefefe
| 4373 Crespo || 1985 PB ||  || August 14, 1985 || Anderson Mesa || E. Bowell || — || align=right | 5.0 km || 
|-id=374 bgcolor=#fefefe
| 4374 Tadamori || 1987 BJ ||  || January 31, 1987 || Toyota || K. Suzuki, T. Urata || — || align=right | 5.7 km || 
|-id=375 bgcolor=#fefefe
| 4375 Kiyomori || 1987 DQ ||  || February 28, 1987 || Ojima || T. Niijima, T. Urata || FLO || align=right | 5.2 km || 
|-id=376 bgcolor=#fefefe
| 4376 Shigemori || 1987 FA ||  || March 20, 1987 || Ojima || T. Niijima, T. Urata || — || align=right | 5.0 km || 
|-id=377 bgcolor=#fefefe
| 4377 Koremori || 1987 GD ||  || April 4, 1987 || Ojima || T. Niijima, T. Urata || — || align=right | 9.5 km || 
|-id=378 bgcolor=#E9E9E9
| 4378 Voigt || 1988 JF ||  || May 14, 1988 || La Silla || W. Landgraf || — || align=right | 11 km || 
|-id=379 bgcolor=#d6d6d6
| 4379 Snelling ||  ||  || August 13, 1988 || Palomar || C. S. Shoemaker, E. M. Shoemaker || ALA || align=right | 20 km || 
|-id=380 bgcolor=#d6d6d6
| 4380 Geyer ||  ||  || August 14, 1988 || Haute-Provence || E. W. Elst || — || align=right | 17 km || 
|-id=381 bgcolor=#d6d6d6
| 4381 Uenohara ||  ||  || November 22, 1989 || Uenohara || N. Kawasato || — || align=right | 20 km || 
|-id=382 bgcolor=#E9E9E9
| 4382 Stravinsky ||  ||  || November 29, 1989 || Tautenburg Observatory || F. Börngen || — || align=right | 8.7 km || 
|-id=383 bgcolor=#fefefe
| 4383 Suruga || 1989 XP ||  || December 1, 1989 || Gekko || Y. Oshima || moon || align=right | 6.5 km || 
|-id=384 bgcolor=#E9E9E9
| 4384 Henrybuhl || 1990 AA ||  || January 3, 1990 || Okutama || T. Hioki, S. Hayakawa || — || align=right | 8.6 km || 
|-id=385 bgcolor=#d6d6d6
| 4385 Elsässer || 2534 P-L ||  || September 24, 1960 || Palomar || PLS || THM || align=right | 11 km || 
|-id=386 bgcolor=#d6d6d6
| 4386 Lüst || 6829 P-L ||  || September 26, 1960 || Palomar || PLS || — || align=right | 16 km || 
|-id=387 bgcolor=#fefefe
| 4387 Tanaka || 4829 T-2 ||  || September 19, 1973 || Palomar || PLS || — || align=right | 7.1 km || 
|-id=388 bgcolor=#fefefe
| 4388 Jürgenstock || 1964 VE ||  || November 3, 1964 || Brooklyn || Indiana University || PHO || align=right | 4.7 km || 
|-id=389 bgcolor=#d6d6d6
| 4389 Durbin ||  ||  || April 1, 1976 || Nauchnij || N. S. Chernykh || KOR || align=right | 10 km || 
|-id=390 bgcolor=#fefefe
| 4390 Madreteresa ||  ||  || April 5, 1976 || El Leoncito || Félix Aguilar Obs. || — || align=right | 11 km || 
|-id=391 bgcolor=#fefefe
| 4391 Balodis ||  ||  || August 21, 1977 || Nauchnij || N. S. Chernykh || — || align=right | 3.4 km || 
|-id=392 bgcolor=#fefefe
| 4392 Agita ||  ||  || September 13, 1978 || Nauchnij || N. S. Chernykh || — || align=right | 5.0 km || 
|-id=393 bgcolor=#d6d6d6
| 4393 Dawe ||  ||  || November 7, 1978 || Palomar || E. F. Helin, S. J. Bus || THM || align=right | 15 km || 
|-id=394 bgcolor=#fefefe
| 4394 Fritzheide ||  ||  || March 2, 1981 || Siding Spring || S. J. Bus || — || align=right | 2.6 km || 
|-id=395 bgcolor=#d6d6d6
| 4395 Danbritt ||  ||  || March 2, 1981 || Siding Spring || S. J. Bus || EOS || align=right | 11 km || 
|-id=396 bgcolor=#fefefe
| 4396 Gressmann || 1981 JH ||  || May 3, 1981 || Anderson Mesa || E. Bowell || — || align=right | 4.7 km || 
|-id=397 bgcolor=#fefefe
| 4397 Jalopez ||  ||  || May 9, 1981 || El Leoncito || Félix Aguilar Obs. || FLO || align=right | 4.6 km || 
|-id=398 bgcolor=#fefefe
| 4398 Chiara ||  ||  || April 23, 1984 || La Silla || W. Ferreri || — || align=right | 6.9 km || 
|-id=399 bgcolor=#E9E9E9
| 4399 Ashizuri || 1984 UA ||  || October 21, 1984 || Geisei || T. Seki || EUN || align=right | 8.8 km || 
|-id=400 bgcolor=#fefefe
| 4400 Bagryana ||  ||  || August 24, 1985 || Smolyan || Bulgarian National Obs. || — || align=right | 5.4 km || 
|}

4401–4500 

|-bgcolor=#FFC2E0
| 4401 Aditi || 1985 TB ||  || October 14, 1985 || Palomar || C. S. Shoemaker || AMO +1km || align=right | 1.8 km || 
|-id=402 bgcolor=#d6d6d6
| 4402 Tsunemori || 1987 DP ||  || February 25, 1987 || Ojima || T. Niijima, T. Urata || — || align=right | 9.2 km || 
|-id=403 bgcolor=#fefefe
| 4403 Kuniharu || 1987 EA ||  || March 2, 1987 || Gekko || Y. Oshima || — || align=right | 4.8 km || 
|-id=404 bgcolor=#E9E9E9
| 4404 Enirac || 1987 GG ||  || April 2, 1987 || Palomar || A. Maury || — || align=right | 6.2 km || 
|-id=405 bgcolor=#d6d6d6
| 4405 Otava ||  ||  || August 21, 1987 || Kleť || A. Mrkos || — || align=right | 16 km || 
|-id=406 bgcolor=#d6d6d6
| 4406 Mahler ||  ||  || December 22, 1987 || Tautenburg Observatory || F. Börngen || — || align=right | 13 km || 
|-id=407 bgcolor=#E9E9E9
| 4407 Taihaku ||  ||  || October 13, 1988 || Ayashi Station || M. Koishikawa || WIT || align=right | 9.3 km || 
|-id=408 bgcolor=#fefefe
| 4408 Zlatá Koruna ||  ||  || October 4, 1988 || Kleť || A. Mrkos || — || align=right | 7.3 km || 
|-id=409 bgcolor=#d6d6d6
| 4409 Kissling || 1989 MD ||  || June 30, 1989 || Lake Tekapo || A. C. Gilmore, P. M. Kilmartin || — || align=right | 12 km || 
|-id=410 bgcolor=#d6d6d6
| 4410 Kamuimintara || 1989 YA ||  || December 17, 1989 || Kushiro || S. Ueda, H. Kaneda || — || align=right | 14 km || 
|-id=411 bgcolor=#fefefe
| 4411 Kochibunkyo || 1990 AF ||  || January 3, 1990 || Geisei || T. Seki || — || align=right | 4.4 km || 
|-id=412 bgcolor=#d6d6d6
| 4412 Chephren || 2535 P-L ||  || September 26, 1960 || Palomar || PLS || THM || align=right | 15 km || 
|-id=413 bgcolor=#fefefe
| 4413 Mycerinos || 4020 P-L ||  || September 24, 1960 || Palomar || PLS || — || align=right | 5.1 km || 
|-id=414 bgcolor=#fefefe
| 4414 Sesostris || 4153 P-L ||  || September 24, 1960 || Palomar || PLS || — || align=right | 9.0 km || 
|-id=415 bgcolor=#fefefe
| 4415 Echnaton || 4237 P-L ||  || September 24, 1960 || Palomar || PLS || — || align=right | 2.6 km || 
|-id=416 bgcolor=#fefefe
| 4416 Ramses || 4530 P-L ||  || September 24, 1960 || Palomar || PLS || — || align=right | 2.5 km || 
|-id=417 bgcolor=#E9E9E9
| 4417 Lecar || 1931 GC ||  || April 8, 1931 || Heidelberg || K. Reinmuth || GEF || align=right | 11 km || 
|-id=418 bgcolor=#E9E9E9
| 4418 Fredfranklin ||  ||  || October 9, 1931 || Heidelberg || K. Reinmuth || EUN || align=right | 7.0 km || 
|-id=419 bgcolor=#d6d6d6
| 4419 Allancook || 1932 HD ||  || April 24, 1932 || Heidelberg || K. Reinmuth || — || align=right | 17 km || 
|-id=420 bgcolor=#E9E9E9
| 4420 Alandreev || 1936 PB ||  || August 15, 1936 || Crimea-Simeis || G. N. Neujmin || — || align=right | 16 km || 
|-id=421 bgcolor=#E9E9E9
| 4421 Kayor || 1942 AC ||  || January 14, 1942 || Heidelberg || K. Reinmuth || — || align=right | 9.2 km || 
|-id=422 bgcolor=#fefefe
| 4422 Jarre || 1942 UA ||  || October 17, 1942 || Algiers || L. Boyer || FLO || align=right | 6.3 km || 
|-id=423 bgcolor=#d6d6d6
| 4423 Golden || 1949 GH ||  || April 4, 1949 || Brooklyn || Indiana University || 7:4 || align=right | 9.9 km || 
|-id=424 bgcolor=#E9E9E9
| 4424 Arkhipova || 1967 DB ||  || February 16, 1967 || Nauchnij || T. M. Smirnova || — || align=right | 24 km || 
|-id=425 bgcolor=#fefefe
| 4425 Bilk || 1967 UQ ||  || October 30, 1967 || Hamburg-Bergedorf || L. Kohoutek || NYS || align=right | 5.3 km || 
|-id=426 bgcolor=#E9E9E9
| 4426 Roerich ||  ||  || October 15, 1969 || Nauchnij || L. I. Chernykh || — || align=right | 11 km || 
|-id=427 bgcolor=#d6d6d6
| 4427 Burnashev ||  ||  || August 30, 1971 || Nauchnij || T. M. Smirnova || EOS || align=right | 12 km || 
|-id=428 bgcolor=#fefefe
| 4428 Khotinok || 1977 SN ||  || September 18, 1977 || Nauchnij || N. S. Chernykh || — || align=right | 6.0 km || 
|-id=429 bgcolor=#fefefe
| 4429 Chinmoy ||  ||  || September 12, 1978 || Nauchnij || N. S. Chernykh || NYS || align=right | 2.9 km || 
|-id=430 bgcolor=#d6d6d6
| 4430 Govorukhin ||  ||  || September 26, 1978 || Nauchnij || L. V. Zhuravleva || JLI || align=right | 13 km || 
|-id=431 bgcolor=#d6d6d6
| 4431 Holeungholee ||  ||  || November 28, 1978 || Nanking || Purple Mountain Obs. || — || align=right | 24 km || 
|-id=432 bgcolor=#fefefe
| 4432 McGraw-Hill ||  ||  || March 2, 1981 || Siding Spring || S. J. Bus || — || align=right | 3.0 km || 
|-id=433 bgcolor=#fefefe
| 4433 Goldstone || 1981 QP ||  || August 30, 1981 || Anderson Mesa || E. Bowell || — || align=right | 8.4 km || 
|-id=434 bgcolor=#fefefe
| 4434 Nikulin ||  ||  || September 8, 1981 || Nauchnij || L. V. Zhuravleva || — || align=right | 5.1 km || 
|-id=435 bgcolor=#FA8072
| 4435 Holt ||  ||  || January 13, 1983 || Palomar || C. S. Shoemaker || moon || align=right | 5.0 km || 
|-id=436 bgcolor=#d6d6d6
| 4436 Ortizmoreno || 1983 EX ||  || March 9, 1983 || Anderson Mesa || E. Barr || URS || align=right | 31 km || 
|-id=437 bgcolor=#fefefe
| 4437 Yaroshenko ||  ||  || April 10, 1983 || Nauchnij || L. I. Chernykh || — || align=right | 4.7 km || 
|-id=438 bgcolor=#d6d6d6
| 4438 Sykes || 1983 WR ||  || November 29, 1983 || Anderson Mesa || E. Bowell || — || align=right | 27 km || 
|-id=439 bgcolor=#d6d6d6
| 4439 Muroto || 1984 VA ||  || November 2, 1984 || Geisei || T. Seki || — || align=right | 12 km || 
|-id=440 bgcolor=#fefefe
| 4440 Tchantchès || 1984 YV ||  || December 23, 1984 || Haute-Provence || F. Dossin || Hmoon || align=right | 2.1 km || 
|-id=441 bgcolor=#d6d6d6
| 4441 Toshie || 1985 BB ||  || January 26, 1985 || Geisei || T. Seki || — || align=right | 6.5 km || 
|-id=442 bgcolor=#d6d6d6
| 4442 Garcia ||  ||  || September 14, 1985 || Kitt Peak || Spacewatch || — || align=right | 15 km || 
|-id=443 bgcolor=#fefefe
| 4443 Paulet ||  ||  || September 10, 1985 || La Silla || H. Debehogne || — || align=right | 4.6 km || 
|-id=444 bgcolor=#fefefe
| 4444 Escher || 1985 SA ||  || September 16, 1985 || La Silla || H. U. Nørgaard-Nielsen, L. Hansen, P. R. Christensen || V || align=right | 4.0 km || 
|-id=445 bgcolor=#fefefe
| 4445 Jimstratton || 1985 TC ||  || October 15, 1985 || Toyota || K. Suzuki, T. Urata || — || align=right | 4.1 km || 
|-id=446 bgcolor=#d6d6d6
| 4446 Carolyn || 1985 TT ||  || October 15, 1985 || Anderson Mesa || E. Bowell || 3:2 || align=right | 29 km || 
|-id=447 bgcolor=#d6d6d6
| 4447 Kirov ||  ||  || November 7, 1985 || Anderson Mesa || E. Bowell || KOR || align=right | 10 km || 
|-id=448 bgcolor=#E9E9E9
| 4448 Phildavis || 1986 EO ||  || March 5, 1986 || Palomar || C. S. Shoemaker || — || align=right | 13 km || 
|-id=449 bgcolor=#d6d6d6
| 4449 Sobinov ||  ||  || September 3, 1987 || Nauchnij || L. I. Chernykh || — || align=right | 30 km || 
|-id=450 bgcolor=#FFC2E0
| 4450 Pan || 1987 SY ||  || September 25, 1987 || Palomar || C. S. Shoemaker, E. M. Shoemaker || APO +1kmPHA || align=right | 1.3 km || 
|-id=451 bgcolor=#FA8072
| 4451 Grieve || 1988 JJ ||  || May 9, 1988 || Palomar || C. S. Shoemaker || — || align=right | 16 km || 
|-id=452 bgcolor=#E9E9E9
| 4452 Ullacharles || 1988 RN ||  || September 7, 1988 || Brorfelde || P. Jensen || — || align=right | 16 km || 
|-id=453 bgcolor=#d6d6d6
| 4453 Bornholm || 1988 VC ||  || November 3, 1988 || Brorfelde || P. Jensen || EOS || align=right | 11 km || 
|-id=454 bgcolor=#d6d6d6
| 4454 Kumiko || 1988 VW ||  || November 2, 1988 || Kushiro || S. Ueda, H. Kaneda || — || align=right | 13 km || 
|-id=455 bgcolor=#d6d6d6
| 4455 Ruriko || 1988 XA ||  || December 2, 1988 || Kushiro || S. Ueda, H. Kaneda || — || align=right | 14 km || 
|-id=456 bgcolor=#fefefe
| 4456 Mawson || 1989 OG ||  || July 27, 1989 || Siding Spring || R. H. McNaught || — || align=right | 7.6 km || 
|-id=457 bgcolor=#E9E9E9
| 4457 van Gogh || 1989 RU ||  || September 3, 1989 || Haute-Provence || E. W. Elst || — || align=right | 10 km || 
|-id=458 bgcolor=#fefefe
| 4458 Oizumi || 1990 BY ||  || January 21, 1990 || Yatsugatake || Y. Kushida, O. Muramatsu || NYS || align=right | 12 km || 
|-id=459 bgcolor=#fefefe
| 4459 Nusamaibashi ||  ||  || January 30, 1990 || Kushiro || M. Matsuyama, K. Watanabe || NYSslow || align=right | 4.2 km || 
|-id=460 bgcolor=#d6d6d6
| 4460 Bihoro || 1990 DS ||  || February 28, 1990 || Kitami || K. Endate, K. Watanabe || — || align=right | 39 km || 
|-id=461 bgcolor=#d6d6d6
| 4461 Sayama || 1990 EL ||  || March 5, 1990 || Dynic || A. Sugie || BRA || align=right | 17 km || 
|-id=462 bgcolor=#d6d6d6
| 4462 Vaughan ||  ||  || April 24, 1952 || Fort Davis || McDonald Obs. || THM || align=right | 19 km || 
|-id=463 bgcolor=#d6d6d6
| 4463 Marschwarzschild ||  ||  || October 28, 1954 || Brooklyn || Indiana University || THM || align=right | 14 km || 
|-id=464 bgcolor=#fefefe
| 4464 Vulcano || 1966 TE ||  || October 11, 1966 || Nauchnij || N. S. Chernykh || H || align=right | 4.2 km || 
|-id=465 bgcolor=#fefefe
| 4465 Rodita ||  ||  || October 14, 1969 || Nauchnij || B. A. Burnasheva || NYS || align=right | 10 km || 
|-id=466 bgcolor=#d6d6d6
| 4466 Abai ||  ||  || September 23, 1971 || Nauchnij || Crimean Astrophysical Obs. || — || align=right | 11 km || 
|-id=467 bgcolor=#E9E9E9
| 4467 Kaidanovskij ||  ||  || November 2, 1975 || Nauchnij || T. M. Smirnova || EUN || align=right | 13 km || 
|-id=468 bgcolor=#fefefe
| 4468 Pogrebetskij ||  ||  || September 24, 1976 || Nauchnij || N. S. Chernykh || — || align=right | 4.2 km || 
|-id=469 bgcolor=#E9E9E9
| 4469 Utting ||  ||  || August 1, 1978 || Bickley || Perth Obs. || — || align=right | 4.8 km || 
|-id=470 bgcolor=#d6d6d6
| 4470 Sergeev-Censkij ||  ||  || August 31, 1978 || Nauchnij || N. S. Chernykh || THM || align=right | 16 km || 
|-id=471 bgcolor=#d6d6d6
| 4471 Graculus || 1978 VB ||  || November 8, 1978 || Zimmerwald || P. Wild || — || align=right | 12 km || 
|-id=472 bgcolor=#fefefe
| 4472 Navashin ||  ||  || October 15, 1980 || Nauchnij || N. S. Chernykh || FLO || align=right | 5.1 km || 
|-id=473 bgcolor=#d6d6d6
| 4473 Sears ||  ||  || February 28, 1981 || Siding Spring || S. J. Bus || EOS || align=right | 13 km || 
|-id=474 bgcolor=#d6d6d6
| 4474 Proust ||  ||  || August 24, 1981 || La Silla || H. Debehogne || THM || align=right | 13 km || 
|-id=475 bgcolor=#fefefe
| 4475 Voitkevich ||  ||  || October 20, 1982 || Nauchnij || L. G. Karachkina || — || align=right | 5.3 km || 
|-id=476 bgcolor=#fefefe
| 4476 Bernstein || 1983 DE ||  || February 19, 1983 || Anderson Mesa || E. Bowell || NYS || align=right | 3.9 km || 
|-id=477 bgcolor=#fefefe
| 4477 Kelley || 1983 SB ||  || September 28, 1983 || Smolyan || Bulgarian National Obs. || — || align=right | 4.8 km || 
|-id=478 bgcolor=#fefefe
| 4478 Blanco ||  ||  || April 23, 1984 || La Silla || W. Ferreri, V. Zappalà || FLO || align=right | 3.5 km || 
|-id=479 bgcolor=#E9E9E9
| 4479 Charlieparker ||  ||  || February 10, 1985 || La Silla || H. Debehogne || MRX || align=right | 6.9 km || 
|-id=480 bgcolor=#fefefe
| 4480 Nikitibotania ||  ||  || August 24, 1985 || Nauchnij || N. S. Chernykh || NYS || align=right | 9.3 km || 
|-id=481 bgcolor=#fefefe
| 4481 Herbelin || 1985 RR ||  || September 14, 1985 || Anderson Mesa || E. Bowell || — || align=right | 4.2 km || 
|-id=482 bgcolor=#fefefe
| 4482 Frèrebasile || 1986 RB ||  || September 1, 1986 || Palomar || A. Maury || PHO || align=right | 7.1 km || 
|-id=483 bgcolor=#fefefe
| 4483 Petöfi ||  ||  || September 9, 1986 || Nauchnij || L. G. Karachkina || H || align=right | 5.9 km || 
|-id=484 bgcolor=#E9E9E9
| 4484 Sif || 1987 DD ||  || February 25, 1987 || Brorfelde || P. Jensen || BRU || align=right | 16 km || 
|-id=485 bgcolor=#d6d6d6
| 4485 Radonezhskij ||  ||  || August 27, 1987 || Nauchnij || L. I. Chernykh || EOS || align=right | 14 km || 
|-id=486 bgcolor=#FFC2E0
| 4486 Mithra || 1987 SB ||  || September 22, 1987 || Smolyan || E. W. Elst, V. G. Shkodrov || APO +1kmPHA || align=right | 1.8 km || 
|-id=487 bgcolor=#FFC2E0
| 4487 Pocahontas || 1987 UA ||  || October 17, 1987 || Palomar || C. S. Shoemaker || AMO +1km || align=right | 1.2 km || 
|-id=488 bgcolor=#fefefe
| 4488 Tokitada || 1987 UK ||  || October 21, 1987 || Toyota || K. Suzuki, T. Urata || FLO || align=right | 4.5 km || 
|-id=489 bgcolor=#C2FFFF
| 4489 Dracius || 1988 AK ||  || January 15, 1988 || Anderson Mesa || E. Bowell || L4 || align=right | 77 km || 
|-id=490 bgcolor=#fefefe
| 4490 Bambery || 1988 ND ||  || July 14, 1988 || Palomar || E. F. Helin, B. Roman || H || align=right | 9.3 km || 
|-id=491 bgcolor=#fefefe
| 4491 Otaru || 1988 RP ||  || September 7, 1988 || Kitami || K. Endate, K. Watanabe || — || align=right | 5.1 km || 
|-id=492 bgcolor=#E9E9E9
| 4492 Debussy || 1988 SH ||  || September 17, 1988 || Haute-Provence || E. W. Elst || moon || align=right | 17 km || 
|-id=493 bgcolor=#d6d6d6
| 4493 Naitomitsu ||  ||  || October 14, 1988 || Chiyoda || T. Kojima || EOS || align=right | 17 km || 
|-id=494 bgcolor=#fefefe
| 4494 Marimo ||  ||  || October 13, 1988 || Kushiro || S. Ueda, H. Kaneda || — || align=right | 5.7 km || 
|-id=495 bgcolor=#d6d6d6
| 4495 Dassanowsky || 1988 VS ||  || November 6, 1988 || Yorii || M. Arai, H. Mori || 3:2 || align=right | 24 km || 
|-id=496 bgcolor=#E9E9E9
| 4496 Kamimachi ||  ||  || December 9, 1988 || Geisei || T. Seki || AGN || align=right | 7.2 km || 
|-id=497 bgcolor=#fefefe
| 4497 Taguchi ||  ||  || January 4, 1989 || Kitami || K. Endate, K. Watanabe || — || align=right | 7.8 km || 
|-id=498 bgcolor=#d6d6d6
| 4498 Shinkoyama ||  ||  || January 5, 1989 || Geisei || T. Seki || EOS || align=right | 17 km || 
|-id=499 bgcolor=#d6d6d6
| 4499 Davidallen ||  ||  || January 4, 1989 || Siding Spring || R. H. McNaught || — || align=right | 16 km || 
|-id=500 bgcolor=#d6d6d6
| 4500 Pascal || 1989 CL ||  || February 3, 1989 || Kushiro || S. Ueda, H. Kaneda || — || align=right | 16 km || 
|}

4501–4600 

|-bgcolor=#C2FFFF
| 4501 Eurypylos ||  ||  || February 4, 1989 || La Silla || E. W. Elst || L4 || align=right | 46 km || 
|-id=502 bgcolor=#E9E9E9
| 4502 Elizabethann || 1989 KG ||  || May 29, 1989 || Palomar || H. E. Holt || — || align=right | 12 km || 
|-id=503 bgcolor=#FFC2E0
| 4503 Cleobulus || 1989 WM ||  || November 28, 1989 || Palomar || C. S. Shoemaker || AMO +1km || align=right | 2.5 km || 
|-id=504 bgcolor=#E9E9E9
| 4504 Jenkinson || 1989 YO ||  || December 21, 1989 || Siding Spring || R. H. McNaught || MAR || align=right | 7.4 km || 
|-id=505 bgcolor=#d6d6d6
| 4505 Okamura ||  ||  || February 20, 1990 || Geisei || T. Seki || EOS || align=right | 19 km || 
|-id=506 bgcolor=#d6d6d6
| 4506 Hendrie || 1990 FJ ||  || March 24, 1990 || Stakenbridge || B. G. W. Manning || KOR || align=right | 8.8 km || 
|-id=507 bgcolor=#d6d6d6
| 4507 Petercollins || 1990 FV ||  || March 19, 1990 || Fujieda || H. Shiozawa, M. Kizawa || KAR || align=right | 11 km || 
|-id=508 bgcolor=#fefefe
| 4508 Takatsuki ||  ||  || March 27, 1990 || Kitami || K. Endate, K. Watanabe || — || align=right | 4.6 km || 
|-id=509 bgcolor=#E9E9E9
| 4509 Gorbatskij || A917 SG ||  || September 23, 1917 || Crimea-Simeis || S. Belyavskyj || — || align=right | 12 km || 
|-id=510 bgcolor=#fefefe
| 4510 Shawna || 1930 XK ||  || December 13, 1930 || Flagstaff || C. W. Tombaugh || V || align=right | 6.8 km || 
|-id=511 bgcolor=#fefefe
| 4511 Rembrandt ||  ||  || September 28, 1935 || Johannesburg || H. van Gent || PHO || align=right | 8.2 km || 
|-id=512 bgcolor=#E9E9E9
| 4512 Sinuhe || 1939 BM ||  || January 20, 1939 || Turku || Y. Väisälä || — || align=right | 11 km || 
|-id=513 bgcolor=#d6d6d6
| 4513 Louvre ||  ||  || August 30, 1971 || Nauchnij || T. M. Smirnova || EOS || align=right | 13 km || 
|-id=514 bgcolor=#fefefe
| 4514 Vilen || 1972 HX ||  || April 19, 1972 || Nauchnij || T. M. Smirnova || moon || align=right | 5.1 km || 
|-id=515 bgcolor=#fefefe
| 4515 Khrennikov ||  ||  || September 28, 1973 || Nauchnij || N. S. Chernykh || NYS || align=right | 5.3 km || 
|-id=516 bgcolor=#E9E9E9
| 4516 Pugovkin ||  ||  || September 28, 1973 || Nauchnij || N. S. Chernykh || HOF || align=right | 7.8 km || 
|-id=517 bgcolor=#fefefe
| 4517 Ralpharvey || 1975 SV ||  || September 30, 1975 || Palomar || S. J. Bus || — || align=right | 3.4 km || 
|-id=518 bgcolor=#fefefe
| 4518 Raikin ||  ||  || April 1, 1976 || Nauchnij || N. S. Chernykh || V || align=right | 4.3 km || 
|-id=519 bgcolor=#fefefe
| 4519 Voronezh ||  ||  || December 18, 1976 || Nauchnij || N. S. Chernykh || — || align=right | 5.0 km || 
|-id=520 bgcolor=#fefefe
| 4520 Dovzhenko ||  ||  || August 22, 1977 || Nauchnij || N. S. Chernykh || — || align=right | 5.9 km || 
|-id=521 bgcolor=#d6d6d6
| 4521 Akimov ||  ||  || March 29, 1979 || Nauchnij || N. S. Chernykh || — || align=right | 20 km || 
|-id=522 bgcolor=#E9E9E9
| 4522 Britastra || 1980 BM ||  || January 22, 1980 || Anderson Mesa || E. Bowell || ADE || align=right | 21 km || 
|-id=523 bgcolor=#E9E9E9
| 4523 MIT ||  ||  || February 28, 1981 || Siding Spring || S. J. Bus || ADE || align=right | 16 km || 
|-id=524 bgcolor=#fefefe
| 4524 Barklajdetolli ||  ||  || September 8, 1981 || Nauchnij || L. V. Zhuravleva || Vslow || align=right | 12 km || 
|-id=525 bgcolor=#E9E9E9
| 4525 Johnbauer ||  ||  || May 15, 1982 || Palomar || E. F. Helin, E. M. Shoemaker, P. D. Wilder || MIT || align=right | 9.8 km || 
|-id=526 bgcolor=#E9E9E9
| 4526 Konko ||  ||  || May 22, 1982 || Kiso || H. Kosai, K. Furukawa || EUN || align=right | 10 km || 
|-id=527 bgcolor=#fefefe
| 4527 Schoenberg || 1982 OK ||  || July 24, 1982 || Anderson Mesa || E. Bowell || — || align=right | 3.9 km || 
|-id=528 bgcolor=#E9E9E9
| 4528 Berg || 1983 PP ||  || August 13, 1983 || Anderson Mesa || E. Bowell || — || align=right | 9.4 km || 
|-id=529 bgcolor=#d6d6d6
| 4529 Webern || 1984 ED ||  || March 1, 1984 || Anderson Mesa || E. Bowell || EOS || align=right | 10 km || 
|-id=530 bgcolor=#d6d6d6
| 4530 Smoluchowski || 1984 EP ||  || March 1, 1984 || Anderson Mesa || E. Bowell || HYG || align=right | 16 km || 
|-id=531 bgcolor=#fefefe
| 4531 Asaro || 1985 FC ||  || March 20, 1985 || Palomar || C. S. Shoemaker || H || align=right | 2.2 km || 
|-id=532 bgcolor=#d6d6d6
| 4532 Copland ||  ||  || April 15, 1985 || Anderson Mesa || E. Bowell || EOS || align=right | 14 km || 
|-id=533 bgcolor=#fefefe
| 4533 Orth || 1986 EL ||  || March 7, 1986 || Palomar || C. S. Shoemaker || PHO || align=right | 7.5 km || 
|-id=534 bgcolor=#E9E9E9
| 4534 Rimskij-Korsakov ||  ||  || August 6, 1986 || Nauchnij || N. S. Chernykh || — || align=right | 16 km || 
|-id=535 bgcolor=#E9E9E9
| 4535 Adamcarolla ||  ||  || August 28, 1986 || La Silla || H. Debehogne || — || align=right | 10 km || 
|-id=536 bgcolor=#fefefe
| 4536 Drewpinsky ||  ||  || February 22, 1987 || La Silla || H. Debehogne || FLO || align=right | 4.0 km || 
|-id=537 bgcolor=#d6d6d6
| 4537 Valgrirasp ||  ||  || September 2, 1987 || Nauchnij || L. I. Chernykh || EOS || align=right | 14 km || 
|-id=538 bgcolor=#fefefe
| 4538 Vishyanand || 1988 TP ||  || October 10, 1988 || Toyota || K. Suzuki || — || align=right | 7.2 km || 
|-id=539 bgcolor=#E9E9E9
| 4539 Miyagino ||  ||  || November 8, 1988 || Ayashi Station || M. Koishikawa || — || align=right | 10 km || 
|-id=540 bgcolor=#E9E9E9
| 4540 Oriani ||  ||  || November 6, 1988 || Bologna || San Vittore Obs. || — || align=right | 15 km || 
|-id=541 bgcolor=#fefefe
| 4541 Mizuno || 1989 AF ||  || January 1, 1989 || Toyota || K. Suzuki, T. Furuta || moon || align=right | 6.3 km || 
|-id=542 bgcolor=#d6d6d6
| 4542 Mossotti || 1989 BO ||  || January 30, 1989 || Bologna || San Vittore Obs. || EOS || align=right | 18 km || 
|-id=543 bgcolor=#C2FFFF
| 4543 Phoinix ||  ||  || February 2, 1989 || Palomar || C. S. Shoemaker || L4 || align=right | 64 km || 
|-id=544 bgcolor=#FFC2E0
| 4544 Xanthus || 1989 FB ||  || March 31, 1989 || Palomar || H. E. Holt, N. G. Thomas || APO +1km || align=right | 1.3 km || 
|-id=545 bgcolor=#d6d6d6
| 4545 Primolevi ||  ||  || September 28, 1989 || La Silla || H. Debehogne || THM || align=right | 17 km || 
|-id=546 bgcolor=#fefefe
| 4546 Franck ||  ||  || March 2, 1990 || La Silla || E. W. Elst || V || align=right | 5.7 km || 
|-id=547 bgcolor=#E9E9E9
| 4547 Massachusetts || 1990 KP ||  || May 16, 1990 || JCPM Sapporo || K. Endate, K. Watanabe || — || align=right | 33 km || 
|-id=548 bgcolor=#fefefe
| 4548 Wielen || 2538 P-L ||  || September 24, 1960 || Palomar || PLS || — || align=right | 5.2 km || 
|-id=549 bgcolor=#fefefe
| 4549 Burkhardt || 1276 T-2 ||  || September 29, 1973 || Palomar || PLS || NYS || align=right | 3.5 km || 
|-id=550 bgcolor=#d6d6d6
| 4550 Royclarke ||  ||  || April 24, 1977 || Palomar || S. J. Bus || — || align=right | 13 km || 
|-id=551 bgcolor=#fefefe
| 4551 Cochran || 1979 MC ||  || June 28, 1979 || Anderson Mesa || E. Bowell || — || align=right | 7.6 km || 
|-id=552 bgcolor=#fefefe
| 4552 Nabelek || 1980 JC ||  || May 11, 1980 || Kleť || A. Mrkos || — || align=right | 5.4 km || 
|-id=553 bgcolor=#E9E9E9
| 4553 Doncampbell || 1982 RH ||  || September 15, 1982 || Anderson Mesa || E. Bowell || — || align=right | 9.0 km || 
|-id=554 bgcolor=#d6d6d6
| 4554 Fanynka || 1986 UT ||  || October 28, 1986 || Kleť || A. Mrkos || — || align=right | 26 km || 
|-id=555 bgcolor=#fefefe
| 4555 Josefapérez || 1987 QL ||  || August 24, 1987 || Palomar || S. Singer-Brewster || — || align=right | 3.1 km || 
|-id=556 bgcolor=#fefefe
| 4556 Gumilyov ||  ||  || August 27, 1987 || Nauchnij || L. G. Karachkina || — || align=right | 5.2 km || 
|-id=557 bgcolor=#d6d6d6
| 4557 Mika || 1987 XD ||  || December 14, 1987 || Kitami || M. Yanai, K. Watanabe || EOS || align=right | 14 km || 
|-id=558 bgcolor=#FA8072
| 4558 Janesick || 1988 NF ||  || July 12, 1988 || Palomar || A. Maury, J. E. Mueller || slow? || align=right | 7.3 km || 
|-id=559 bgcolor=#d6d6d6
| 4559 Strauss ||  ||  || January 11, 1989 || Tautenburg Observatory || F. Börngen || EOS || align=right | 11 km || 
|-id=560 bgcolor=#d6d6d6
| 4560 Klyuchevskij ||  ||  || December 16, 1976 || Nauchnij || L. I. Chernykh || — || align=right | 12 km || 
|-id=561 bgcolor=#E9E9E9
| 4561 Lemeshev ||  ||  || September 13, 1978 || Nauchnij || N. S. Chernykh || — || align=right | 10 km || 
|-id=562 bgcolor=#fefefe
| 4562 Poleungkuk ||  ||  || October 21, 1979 || Nanking || Purple Mountain Obs. || — || align=right | 15 km || 
|-id=563 bgcolor=#fefefe
| 4563 Kahnia || 1980 OG ||  || July 17, 1980 || Anderson Mesa || E. Bowell || — || align=right | 5.1 km || 
|-id=564 bgcolor=#E9E9E9
| 4564 Clayton ||  ||  || March 6, 1981 || Siding Spring || S. J. Bus || — || align=right | 5.1 km || 
|-id=565 bgcolor=#E9E9E9
| 4565 Grossman ||  ||  || March 2, 1981 || Siding Spring || S. J. Bus || — || align=right | 7.4 km || 
|-id=566 bgcolor=#d6d6d6
| 4566 Chaokuangpiu ||  ||  || November 27, 1981 || Nanking || Purple Mountain Obs. || ITH || align=right | 11 km || 
|-id=567 bgcolor=#E9E9E9
| 4567 Bečvář ||  ||  || September 17, 1982 || Kleť || M. Mahrová || EUN || align=right | 12 km || 
|-id=568 bgcolor=#d6d6d6
| 4568 Menkaure ||  ||  || September 2, 1983 || Anderson Mesa || N. G. Thomas || EOS || align=right | 15 km || 
|-id=569 bgcolor=#E9E9E9
| 4569 Baerbel ||  ||  || April 15, 1985 || Palomar || C. S. Shoemaker || MAR || align=right | 9.4 km || 
|-id=570 bgcolor=#fefefe
| 4570 Runcorn || 1985 PR ||  || August 14, 1985 || Anderson Mesa || E. Bowell || FLO || align=right | 3.9 km || 
|-id=571 bgcolor=#d6d6d6
| 4571 Grumiaux ||  ||  || September 8, 1985 || La Silla || H. Debehogne || THM || align=right | 15 km || 
|-id=572 bgcolor=#E9E9E9
| 4572 Brage || 1986 RF ||  || September 8, 1986 || Brorfelde || P. Jensen || — || align=right | 8.1 km || 
|-id=573 bgcolor=#d6d6d6
| 4573 Piešťany ||  ||  || October 5, 1986 || Piwnice || M. Antal || — || align=right | 15 km || 
|-id=574 bgcolor=#d6d6d6
| 4574 Yoshinaka || 1986 YB ||  || December 20, 1986 || Ojima || T. Niijima, T. Urata || EOS || align=right | 12 km || 
|-id=575 bgcolor=#d6d6d6
| 4575 Broman ||  ||  || June 26, 1987 || Palomar || E. F. Helin || EOS || align=right | 17 km || 
|-id=576 bgcolor=#d6d6d6
| 4576 Yanotoyohiko || 1988 CC ||  || February 10, 1988 || Chiyoda || T. Kojima || EOS || align=right | 17 km || 
|-id=577 bgcolor=#E9E9E9
| 4577 Chikako || 1988 WG ||  || November 30, 1988 || Yatsugatake || Y. Kushida, M. Inoue || — || align=right | 11 km || 
|-id=578 bgcolor=#E9E9E9
| 4578 Kurashiki ||  ||  || December 7, 1988 || Geisei || T. Seki || — || align=right | 12 km || 
|-id=579 bgcolor=#fefefe
| 4579 Puccini ||  ||  || January 11, 1989 || Tautenburg Observatory || F. Börngen || MAS || align=right | 4.5 km || 
|-id=580 bgcolor=#E9E9E9
| 4580 Child || 1989 EF ||  || March 4, 1989 || Palomar || E. F. Helin || EUN || align=right | 11 km || 
|-id=581 bgcolor=#FFC2E0
| 4581 Asclepius || 1989 FC ||  || March 31, 1989 || Palomar || H. E. Holt, N. G. Thomas || APOPHA || align=right data-sort-value="0.25" | 250 m || 
|-id=582 bgcolor=#E9E9E9
| 4582 Hank || 1989 FW ||  || March 31, 1989 || Palomar || C. S. Shoemaker || ADE || align=right | 17 km || 
|-id=583 bgcolor=#fefefe
| 4583 Lugo ||  ||  || September 1, 1989 || Smolyan || Bulgarian National Obs. || — || align=right | 14 km || 
|-id=584 bgcolor=#E9E9E9
| 4584 Akan || 1990 FA ||  || March 16, 1990 || Kushiro || M. Matsuyama, K. Watanabe || DOR || align=right | 15 km || 
|-id=585 bgcolor=#E9E9E9
| 4585 Ainonai || 1990 KQ ||  || May 16, 1990 || Kitami || K. Endate, K. Watanabe || CLO || align=right | 11 km || 
|-id=586 bgcolor=#fefefe
| 4586 Gunvor || 6047 P-L ||  || September 24, 1960 || Palomar || PLS || — || align=right | 4.4 km || 
|-id=587 bgcolor=#FA8072
| 4587 Rees || 3239 T-2 ||  || September 30, 1973 || Palomar || PLS || unusual || align=right | 3.6 km || 
|-id=588 bgcolor=#d6d6d6
| 4588 Wislicenus || 1931 EE ||  || March 13, 1931 || Heidelberg || M. F. Wolf || — || align=right | 14 km || 
|-id=589 bgcolor=#fefefe
| 4589 McDowell || 1933 OB ||  || July 24, 1933 || Heidelberg || K. Reinmuth || NYS || align=right | 6.4 km || 
|-id=590 bgcolor=#fefefe
| 4590 Dimashchegolev ||  ||  || July 25, 1968 || Cerro El Roble || G. A. Plyugin, Yu. A. Belyaev || — || align=right | 6.5 km || 
|-id=591 bgcolor=#fefefe
| 4591 Bryantsev || 1975 VZ ||  || November 1, 1975 || Nauchnij || T. M. Smirnova || — || align=right | 6.4 km || 
|-id=592 bgcolor=#d6d6d6
| 4592 Alkissia ||  ||  || September 24, 1979 || Nauchnij || N. S. Chernykh || THM || align=right | 14 km || 
|-id=593 bgcolor=#d6d6d6
| 4593 Reipurth ||  ||  || March 16, 1980 || La Silla || C.-I. Lagerkvist || EOS || align=right | 12 km || 
|-id=594 bgcolor=#fefefe
| 4594 Dashkova ||  ||  || May 17, 1980 || Nauchnij || L. I. Chernykh || FLO || align=right | 4.0 km || 
|-id=595 bgcolor=#E9E9E9
| 4595 Prinz ||  ||  || March 2, 1981 || Siding Spring || S. J. Bus || — || align=right | 3.8 km || 
|-id=596 bgcolor=#FFC2E0
| 4596 || 1981 QB || — || August 28, 1981 || Palomar || C. T. Kowal || AMO +1km || align=right | 1.9 km || 
|-id=597 bgcolor=#E9E9E9
| 4597 Consolmagno ||  ||  || October 30, 1983 || Palomar || S. J. Bus || — || align=right | 16 km || 
|-id=598 bgcolor=#d6d6d6
| 4598 Coradini ||  ||  || August 15, 1985 || Anderson Mesa || E. Bowell || EOS || align=right | 11 km || 
|-id=599 bgcolor=#d6d6d6
| 4599 Rowan ||  ||  || September 5, 1985 || La Silla || H. Debehogne || — || align=right | 13 km || 
|-id=600 bgcolor=#d6d6d6
| 4600 Meadows ||  ||  || September 10, 1985 || La Silla || H. Debehogne || EOS || align=right | 13 km || 
|}

4601–4700 

|-bgcolor=#E9E9E9
| 4601 Ludkewycz || 1986 LB ||  || June 3, 1986 || Palomar || M. Rudnyk || EUN || align=right | 9.0 km || 
|-id=602 bgcolor=#E9E9E9
| 4602 Heudier ||  ||  || October 28, 1986 || Caussols || CERGA || EUN || align=right | 8.1 km || 
|-id=603 bgcolor=#E9E9E9
| 4603 Bertaud ||  ||  || November 25, 1986 || Caussols || CERGA || JUN || align=right | 22 km || 
|-id=604 bgcolor=#fefefe
| 4604 Stekarstrom || 1987 SK ||  || September 18, 1987 || Toyota || K. Suzuki, T. Urata || — || align=right | 4.5 km || 
|-id=605 bgcolor=#fefefe
| 4605 Nikitin ||  ||  || September 18, 1987 || Nauchnij || L. I. Chernykh || — || align=right | 4.5 km || 
|-id=606 bgcolor=#fefefe
| 4606 Saheki ||  ||  || October 27, 1987 || Geisei || T. Seki || — || align=right | 6.7 km || 
|-id=607 bgcolor=#fefefe
| 4607 Seilandfarm || 1987 WR ||  || November 25, 1987 || Kitami || K. Endate, K. Watanabe || moon || align=right | 7.4 km || 
|-id=608 bgcolor=#fefefe
| 4608 Wodehouse ||  ||  || January 19, 1988 || La Silla || H. Debehogne || — || align=right | 7.6 km || 
|-id=609 bgcolor=#d6d6d6
| 4609 Pizarro ||  ||  || February 13, 1988 || La Silla || E. W. Elst || — || align=right | 29 km || 
|-id=610 bgcolor=#fefefe
| 4610 Kájov || 1989 FO ||  || March 26, 1989 || Kleť || A. Mrkos || — || align=right | 6.9 km || 
|-id=611 bgcolor=#E9E9E9
| 4611 Vulkaneifel ||  ||  || April 5, 1989 || La Silla || M. Geffert || EUN || align=right | 11 km || 
|-id=612 bgcolor=#E9E9E9
| 4612 Greenstein || 1989 JG ||  || May 2, 1989 || Palomar || E. F. Helin || — || align=right | 7.7 km || 
|-id=613 bgcolor=#E9E9E9
| 4613 Mamoru || 1990 OM ||  || July 22, 1990 || JCPM Sapporo || K. Watanabe || — || align=right | 11 km || 
|-id=614 bgcolor=#fefefe
| 4614 Masamura || 1990 QN ||  || August 21, 1990 || Kani || Y. Mizuno, T. Furuta || FLO || align=right | 6.1 km || 
|-id=615 bgcolor=#E9E9E9
| 4615 Zinner || A923 RH ||  || September 13, 1923 || Heidelberg || K. Reinmuth || — || align=right | 11 km || 
|-id=616 bgcolor=#d6d6d6
| 4616 Batalov || 1975 BF ||  || January 17, 1975 || Nauchnij || L. I. Chernykh || THM || align=right | 14 km || 
|-id=617 bgcolor=#d6d6d6
| 4617 Zadunaisky || 1976 DK ||  || February 22, 1976 || El Leoncito || Félix Aguilar Obs. || — || align=right | 33 km || 
|-id=618 bgcolor=#E9E9E9
| 4618 Shakhovskoj ||  ||  || September 12, 1977 || Nauchnij || N. S. Chernykh || MIT || align=right | 9.9 km || 
|-id=619 bgcolor=#E9E9E9
| 4619 Polyakhova ||  ||  || September 11, 1977 || Nauchnij || N. S. Chernykh || — || align=right | 9.1 km || 
|-id=620 bgcolor=#fefefe
| 4620 Bickley || 1978 OK ||  || July 28, 1978 || Bickley || Perth Obs. || — || align=right | 3.8 km || 
|-id=621 bgcolor=#fefefe
| 4621 Tambov ||  ||  || August 27, 1979 || Nauchnij || N. S. Chernykh || — || align=right | 5.7 km || 
|-id=622 bgcolor=#d6d6d6
| 4622 Solovjova ||  ||  || November 16, 1979 || Nauchnij || L. I. Chernykh || — || align=right | 12 km || 
|-id=623 bgcolor=#d6d6d6
| 4623 Obraztsova ||  ||  || October 24, 1981 || Nauchnij || L. I. Chernykh || KOR || align=right | 9.9 km || 
|-id=624 bgcolor=#d6d6d6
| 4624 Stefani ||  ||  || March 23, 1982 || Palomar || C. S. Shoemaker || — || align=right | 14 km || 
|-id=625 bgcolor=#E9E9E9
| 4625 Shchedrin ||  ||  || October 20, 1982 || Nauchnij || L. G. Karachkina || — || align=right | 7.3 km || 
|-id=626 bgcolor=#fefefe
| 4626 Plisetskaya ||  ||  || December 23, 1984 || Nauchnij || L. G. Karachkina || — || align=right | 4.7 km || 
|-id=627 bgcolor=#d6d6d6
| 4627 Pinomogavero ||  ||  || September 5, 1985 || La Silla || H. Debehogne || KOR || align=right | 10 km || 
|-id=628 bgcolor=#E9E9E9
| 4628 Laplace ||  ||  || September 7, 1986 || Smolyan || E. W. Elst || EUN || align=right | 19 km || 
|-id=629 bgcolor=#E9E9E9
| 4629 Walford ||  ||  || October 7, 1986 || Palomar || E. F. Helin || ADE || align=right | 9.7 km || 
|-id=630 bgcolor=#E9E9E9
| 4630 Chaonis || 1987 WA ||  || November 18, 1987 || Chions || J. M. Baur || — || align=right | 7.5 km || 
|-id=631 bgcolor=#fefefe
| 4631 Yabu ||  ||  || November 22, 1987 || Kushiro || S. Ueda, H. Kaneda || FLO || align=right | 5.5 km || 
|-id=632 bgcolor=#fefefe
| 4632 Udagawa || 1987 YB ||  || December 17, 1987 || Chiyoda || T. Kojima || FLO || align=right | 4.6 km || 
|-id=633 bgcolor=#d6d6d6
| 4633 Marinbica ||  ||  || January 14, 1988 || La Silla || H. Debehogne || — || align=right | 13 km || 
|-id=634 bgcolor=#fefefe
| 4634 Shibuya || 1988 BA ||  || January 16, 1988 || Kobuchizawa || M. Inoue, O. Muramatsu || — || align=right | 6.4 km || 
|-id=635 bgcolor=#fefefe
| 4635 Rimbaud ||  ||  || January 21, 1988 || Haute-Provence || E. W. Elst || slow || align=right | 7.5 km || 
|-id=636 bgcolor=#E9E9E9
| 4636 Chile ||  ||  || February 13, 1988 || La Silla || E. W. Elst || EUN || align=right | 6.8 km || 
|-id=637 bgcolor=#fefefe
| 4637 Odorico || 1989 CT ||  || February 8, 1989 || Chions || J. M. Baur || NYS || align=right | 6.3 km || 
|-id=638 bgcolor=#fefefe
| 4638 Estens || 1989 EG ||  || March 2, 1989 || Siding Spring || R. H. McNaught || — || align=right | 4.6 km || 
|-id=639 bgcolor=#E9E9E9
| 4639 Minox ||  ||  || March 5, 1989 || Geisei || T. Seki || RAF || align=right | 6.9 km || 
|-id=640 bgcolor=#fefefe
| 4640 Hara || 1989 GA ||  || April 1, 1989 || Yatsugatake || Y. Kushida, O. Muramatsu || — || align=right | 6.1 km || 
|-id=641 bgcolor=#fefefe
| 4641 Ayako ||  ||  || August 30, 1990 || Kitami || K. Endate, K. Watanabe || — || align=right | 3.5 km || 
|-id=642 bgcolor=#d6d6d6
| 4642 Murchie ||  ||  || August 23, 1990 || Palomar || H. E. Holt || THM || align=right | 17 km || 
|-id=643 bgcolor=#fefefe
| 4643 Cisneros ||  ||  || August 23, 1990 || Palomar || H. E. Holt || EUT || align=right | 5.7 km || 
|-id=644 bgcolor=#E9E9E9
| 4644 Oumu ||  ||  || September 16, 1990 || Kitami || A. Takahashi, K. Watanabe || EUN || align=right | 7.5 km || 
|-id=645 bgcolor=#E9E9E9
| 4645 Tentaikojo ||  ||  || September 16, 1990 || Kitami || T. Fujii, K. Watanabe || — || align=right | 17 km || 
|-id=646 bgcolor=#fefefe
| 4646 Kwee || 4009 P-L ||  || September 24, 1960 || Palomar || PLS || NYS || align=right | 3.3 km || 
|-id=647 bgcolor=#d6d6d6
| 4647 Syuji ||  ||  || October 9, 1931 || Heidelberg || K. Reinmuth || — || align=right | 14 km || 
|-id=648 bgcolor=#fefefe
| 4648 Tirion || 1931 UE ||  || October 18, 1931 || Heidelberg || K. Reinmuth || KLI || align=right | 10 km || 
|-id=649 bgcolor=#E9E9E9
| 4649 Sumoto || 1936 YD ||  || December 20, 1936 || Nice || M. Laugier || — || align=right | 15 km || 
|-id=650 bgcolor=#fefefe
| 4650 Mori || 1950 TF ||  || October 5, 1950 || Heidelberg || K. Reinmuth || FLO || align=right | 5.0 km || 
|-id=651 bgcolor=#d6d6d6
| 4651 Wongkwancheng ||  ||  || October 31, 1957 || Nanking || Purple Mountain Obs. || KOR || align=right | 8.1 km || 
|-id=652 bgcolor=#E9E9E9
| 4652 Iannini || 1975 QO ||  || August 30, 1975 || El Leoncito || Félix Aguilar Obs. || IAN || align=right | 6.3 km || 
|-id=653 bgcolor=#E9E9E9
| 4653 Tommaso ||  ||  || April 1, 1976 || Nauchnij || N. S. Chernykh || — || align=right | 7.8 km || 
|-id=654 bgcolor=#fefefe
| 4654 Gorʹkavyj ||  ||  || September 11, 1977 || Nauchnij || N. S. Chernykh || FLO || align=right | 3.9 km || 
|-id=655 bgcolor=#fefefe
| 4655 Marjoriika || 1978 RS ||  || September 1, 1978 || Nauchnij || N. S. Chernykh || — || align=right | 5.3 km || 
|-id=656 bgcolor=#d6d6d6
| 4656 Huchra ||  ||  || November 7, 1978 || Palomar || E. F. Helin, S. J. Bus || KOR || align=right | 6.9 km || 
|-id=657 bgcolor=#d6d6d6
| 4657 Lopez ||  ||  || September 22, 1979 || Nauchnij || N. S. Chernykh || THM || align=right | 16 km || 
|-id=658 bgcolor=#d6d6d6
| 4658 Gavrilov ||  ||  || September 24, 1979 || Nauchnij || N. S. Chernykh || THM || align=right | 12 km || 
|-id=659 bgcolor=#fefefe
| 4659 Roddenberry ||  ||  || March 2, 1981 || Siding Spring || S. J. Bus || NYS || align=right | 3.6 km || 
|-id=660 bgcolor=#FFC2E0
| 4660 Nereus || 1982 DB ||  || February 28, 1982 || Palomar || E. F. Helin || APOPHA || align=right data-sort-value="0.33" | 330 m || 
|-id=661 bgcolor=#fefefe
| 4661 Yebes || 1982 WM ||  || November 17, 1982 || Yebes || M. de Pascual || — || align=right | 6.0 km || 
|-id=662 bgcolor=#E9E9E9
| 4662 Runk || 1984 HL ||  || April 19, 1984 || Kleť || A. Mrkos || — || align=right | 17 km || 
|-id=663 bgcolor=#d6d6d6
| 4663 Falta ||  ||  || September 27, 1984 || Kleť || A. Mrkos || — || align=right | 29 km || 
|-id=664 bgcolor=#d6d6d6
| 4664 Hanner || 1985 PJ ||  || August 14, 1985 || Anderson Mesa || E. Bowell || KOR || align=right | 11 km || 
|-id=665 bgcolor=#d6d6d6
| 4665 Muinonen ||  ||  || October 15, 1985 || Anderson Mesa || E. Bowell || — || align=right | 10 km || 
|-id=666 bgcolor=#fefefe
| 4666 Dietz ||  ||  || May 4, 1986 || Palomar || C. S. Shoemaker || moon || align=right | 6.8 km || 
|-id=667 bgcolor=#E9E9E9
| 4667 Robbiesh || 1986 VC ||  || November 4, 1986 || Siding Spring || R. H. McNaught || — || align=right | 6.9 km || 
|-id=668 bgcolor=#d6d6d6
| 4668 Rayjay ||  ||  || February 21, 1987 || La Silla || H. Debehogne || EOS || align=right | 14 km || 
|-id=669 bgcolor=#fefefe
| 4669 Høder ||  ||  || October 27, 1987 || Brorfelde || P. Jensen || FLO || align=right | 3.9 km || 
|-id=670 bgcolor=#fefefe
| 4670 Yoshinogawa || 1987 YJ ||  || December 19, 1987 || Geisei || T. Seki || FLO || align=right | 4.4 km || 
|-id=671 bgcolor=#fefefe
| 4671 Drtikol ||  ||  || January 10, 1988 || Kleť || A. Mrkos || — || align=right | 6.2 km || 
|-id=672 bgcolor=#d6d6d6
| 4672 Takuboku || 1988 HB ||  || April 17, 1988 || Kushiro || S. Ueda, H. Kaneda || — || align=right | 28 km || 
|-id=673 bgcolor=#E9E9E9
| 4673 Bortle || 1988 LF ||  || June 8, 1988 || Palomar || C. S. Shoemaker || — || align=right | 11 km || 
|-id=674 bgcolor=#fefefe
| 4674 Pauling || 1989 JC ||  || May 2, 1989 || Palomar || E. F. Helin || Hmoon || align=right | 4.8 km || 
|-id=675 bgcolor=#fefefe
| 4675 Ohboke || 1990 SD ||  || September 19, 1990 || Geisei || T. Seki || — || align=right | 4.0 km || 
|-id=676 bgcolor=#fefefe
| 4676 Uedaseiji ||  ||  || September 16, 1990 || Kitami || T. Fujii, K. Watanabe || — || align=right | 8.0 km || 
|-id=677 bgcolor=#d6d6d6
| 4677 Hiroshi ||  ||  || September 26, 1990 || Kitami || A. Takahashi, K. Watanabe || THM || align=right | 14 km || 
|-id=678 bgcolor=#fefefe
| 4678 Ninian ||  ||  || September 24, 1990 || Siding Spring || R. H. McNaught || — || align=right | 5.0 km || 
|-id=679 bgcolor=#d6d6d6
| 4679 Sybil ||  ||  || October 9, 1990 || Siding Spring || R. H. McNaught || — || align=right | 12 km || 
|-id=680 bgcolor=#fefefe
| 4680 Lohrmann || 1937 QC ||  || August 31, 1937 || Hamburg-Bergedorf || H.-U. Sandig || FLO || align=right | 3.8 km || 
|-id=681 bgcolor=#d6d6d6
| 4681 Ermak ||  ||  || October 8, 1969 || Nauchnij || L. I. Chernykh || EOS || align=right | 12 km || 
|-id=682 bgcolor=#fefefe
| 4682 Bykov ||  ||  || September 27, 1973 || Nauchnij || L. I. Chernykh || — || align=right | 3.9 km || 
|-id=683 bgcolor=#d6d6d6
| 4683 Veratar ||  ||  || April 1, 1976 || Nauchnij || N. S. Chernykh || THM || align=right | 17 km || 
|-id=684 bgcolor=#fefefe
| 4684 Bendjoya || 1978 GJ ||  || April 10, 1978 || La Silla || H. Debehogne || V || align=right | 5.3 km || 
|-id=685 bgcolor=#d6d6d6
| 4685 Karetnikov ||  ||  || September 27, 1978 || Nauchnij || N. S. Chernykh || THM || align=right | 19 km || 
|-id=686 bgcolor=#fefefe
| 4686 Maisica ||  ||  || September 22, 1979 || Nauchnij || N. S. Chernykh || — || align=right | 3.5 km || 
|-id=687 bgcolor=#d6d6d6
| 4687 Brunsandrej ||  ||  || September 24, 1979 || Nauchnij || N. S. Chernykh || HYG || align=right | 12 km || 
|-id=688 bgcolor=#FFC2E0
| 4688 || 1980 WF || — || November 29, 1980 || Palomar || C. T. Kowal || AMO || align=right data-sort-value="0.6" | 600 m || 
|-id=689 bgcolor=#fefefe
| 4689 Donn || 1980 YB ||  || December 30, 1980 || Anderson Mesa || E. Bowell || FLOslow || align=right | 6.1 km || 
|-id=690 bgcolor=#fefefe
| 4690 Strasbourg || 1983 AJ ||  || January 9, 1983 || Anderson Mesa || B. A. Skiff || H || align=right | 3.2 km || 
|-id=691 bgcolor=#fefefe
| 4691 Toyen || 1983 TU ||  || October 7, 1983 || Kleť || A. Mrkos || FLO || align=right | 7.1 km || 
|-id=692 bgcolor=#fefefe
| 4692 SIMBAD ||  ||  || November 4, 1983 || Anderson Mesa || B. A. Skiff || — || align=right | 4.9 km || 
|-id=693 bgcolor=#fefefe
| 4693 Drummond || 1983 WH ||  || November 28, 1983 || Anderson Mesa || E. Bowell || — || align=right | 4.8 km || 
|-id=694 bgcolor=#E9E9E9
| 4694 Festou || 1985 PM ||  || August 14, 1985 || Anderson Mesa || E. Bowell || — || align=right | 7.7 km || 
|-id=695 bgcolor=#E9E9E9
| 4695 Mediolanum ||  ||  || September 7, 1985 || La Silla || H. Debehogne || EUN || align=right | 10 km || 
|-id=696 bgcolor=#d6d6d6
| 4696 Arpigny || 1985 TP ||  || October 15, 1985 || Anderson Mesa || E. Bowell || KOR || align=right | 11 km || 
|-id=697 bgcolor=#fefefe
| 4697 Novara || 1986 QO ||  || August 26, 1986 || La Silla || H. Debehogne || NYS || align=right | 7.8 km || 
|-id=698 bgcolor=#fefefe
| 4698 Jizera ||  ||  || September 4, 1986 || Kleť || A. Mrkos || — || align=right | 4.4 km || 
|-id=699 bgcolor=#E9E9E9
| 4699 Sootan || 1986 VE ||  || November 4, 1986 || Siding Spring || R. H. McNaught || EUN || align=right | 4.2 km || 
|-id=700 bgcolor=#E9E9E9
| 4700 Carusi ||  ||  || November 6, 1986 || Anderson Mesa || E. Bowell || — || align=right | 7.8 km || 
|}

4701–4800 

|-bgcolor=#E9E9E9
| 4701 Milani ||  ||  || November 6, 1986 || Anderson Mesa || E. Bowell || — || align=right | 14 km || 
|-id=702 bgcolor=#E9E9E9
| 4702 Berounka || 1987 HW ||  || April 23, 1987 || Kleť || A. Mrkos || GEF || align=right | 8.5 km || 
|-id=703 bgcolor=#fefefe
| 4703 Kagoshima || 1988 BL ||  || January 16, 1988 || Kagoshima || M. Mukai, M. Takeishi || FLO || align=right | 4.3 km || 
|-id=704 bgcolor=#E9E9E9
| 4704 Sheena ||  ||  || January 28, 1988 || Siding Spring || R. H. McNaught || EUN || align=right | 5.1 km || 
|-id=705 bgcolor=#fefefe
| 4705 Secchi || 1988 CK ||  || February 13, 1988 || Bologna || San Vittore Obs. || — || align=right | 5.6 km || 
|-id=706 bgcolor=#fefefe
| 4706 Dennisreuter || 1988 DR ||  || February 16, 1988 || Kavalur || R. Rajamohan || — || align=right | 5.6 km || 
|-id=707 bgcolor=#C2FFFF
| 4707 Khryses || 1988 PY ||  || August 13, 1988 || Palomar || C. S. Shoemaker || L5 || align=right | 38 km || 
|-id=708 bgcolor=#C2FFFF
| 4708 Polydoros || 1988 RT ||  || September 11, 1988 || Palomar || C. S. Shoemaker || L5 || align=right | 55 km || 
|-id=709 bgcolor=#C2FFFF
| 4709 Ennomos ||  ||  || October 12, 1988 || Palomar || C. S. Shoemaker || L5ENM || align=right | 91 km || 
|-id=710 bgcolor=#fefefe
| 4710 Wade ||  ||  || January 4, 1989 || Siding Spring || R. H. McNaught || FLO || align=right | 5.8 km || 
|-id=711 bgcolor=#fefefe
| 4711 Kathy || 1989 KD ||  || May 31, 1989 || Palomar || H. E. Holt || — || align=right | 8.2 km || 
|-id=712 bgcolor=#d6d6d6
| 4712 Iwaizumi || 1989 QE ||  || August 25, 1989 || Kitami || K. Endate, K. Watanabe || — || align=right | 29 km || 
|-id=713 bgcolor=#fefefe
| 4713 Steel || 1989 QL ||  || August 26, 1989 || Siding Spring || R. H. McNaught || H || align=right | 6.3 km || 
|-id=714 bgcolor=#d6d6d6
| 4714 Toyohiro || 1989 SH ||  || September 29, 1989 || Kitami || T. Fujii, K. Watanabe || EOS || align=right | 19 km || 
|-id=715 bgcolor=#C2FFFF
| 4715 Medesicaste ||  ||  || October 9, 1989 || Gekko || Y. Oshima || L5 || align=right | 62 km || 
|-id=716 bgcolor=#d6d6d6
| 4716 Urey ||  ||  || October 30, 1989 || Cerro Tololo || S. J. Bus || — || align=right | 15 km || 
|-id=717 bgcolor=#d6d6d6
| 4717 Kaneko || 1989 WX ||  || November 20, 1989 || Kani || Y. Mizuno, T. Furuta || EOS || align=right | 18 km || 
|-id=718 bgcolor=#fefefe
| 4718 Araki ||  ||  || November 13, 1990 || Kitami || T. Fujii, K. Watanabe || — || align=right | 5.9 km || 
|-id=719 bgcolor=#E9E9E9
| 4719 Burnaby ||  ||  || November 21, 1990 || Kushiro || S. Ueda, H. Kaneda || — || align=right | 10 km || 
|-id=720 bgcolor=#fefefe
| 4720 Tottori || 1990 YG ||  || December 19, 1990 || Kushiro || S. Ueda, H. Kaneda || FLO || align=right | 6.0 km || 
|-id=721 bgcolor=#fefefe
| 4721 Atahualpa || 4239 T-2 ||  || September 29, 1973 || Palomar || PLS || FLO || align=right | 4.6 km || 
|-id=722 bgcolor=#C2FFFF
| 4722 Agelaos || 4271 T-3 ||  || October 16, 1977 || Palomar || PLS || L5 || align=right | 50 km || 
|-id=723 bgcolor=#E9E9E9
| 4723 Wolfgangmattig || 1937 TB ||  || October 11, 1937 || Heidelberg || K. Reinmuth || — || align=right | 10 km || 
|-id=724 bgcolor=#fefefe
| 4724 Brocken || 1961 BC ||  || January 18, 1961 || Tautenburg Observatory || C. Hoffmeister, J. Schubart || — || align=right | 6.7 km || 
|-id=725 bgcolor=#d6d6d6
| 4725 Milone || 1975 YE ||  || December 31, 1975 || El Leoncito || Félix Aguilar Obs. || — || align=right | 10 km || 
|-id=726 bgcolor=#E9E9E9
| 4726 Federer ||  ||  || September 25, 1976 || Harvard Observatory || Harvard Obs. || HEN || align=right | 8.3 km || 
|-id=727 bgcolor=#d6d6d6
| 4727 Ravel ||  ||  || October 24, 1979 || Tautenburg Observatory || F. Börngen || KOR || align=right | 7.2 km || 
|-id=728 bgcolor=#fefefe
| 4728 Lyapidevskij || 1979 VG ||  || November 11, 1979 || Nauchnij || N. S. Chernykh || — || align=right | 4.0 km || 
|-id=729 bgcolor=#fefefe
| 4729 Mikhailmilʹ ||  ||  || September 8, 1980 || Nauchnij || L. V. Zhuravleva || — || align=right | 6.0 km || 
|-id=730 bgcolor=#d6d6d6
| 4730 Xingmingzhou || 1980 XZ ||  || December 7, 1980 || Nanking || Purple Mountain Obs. || EOS || align=right | 25 km || 
|-id=731 bgcolor=#d6d6d6
| 4731 Monicagrady ||  ||  || March 1, 1981 || Siding Spring || S. J. Bus || — || align=right | 10 km || 
|-id=732 bgcolor=#d6d6d6
| 4732 Froeschlé || 1981 JG ||  || May 3, 1981 || Anderson Mesa || E. Bowell || — || align=right | 30 km || 
|-id=733 bgcolor=#fefefe
| 4733 ORO ||  ||  || April 19, 1982 || Harvard Observatory || Oak Ridge Observatory || FLO || align=right | 4.7 km || 
|-id=734 bgcolor=#fefefe
| 4734 Rameau ||  ||  || October 19, 1982 || Tautenburg Observatory || F. Börngen || MAS || align=right | 3.0 km || 
|-id=735 bgcolor=#fefefe
| 4735 Gary || 1983 AN ||  || January 9, 1983 || Anderson Mesa || E. Bowell || V || align=right | 5.1 km || 
|-id=736 bgcolor=#fefefe
| 4736 Johnwood ||  ||  || January 13, 1983 || Palomar || C. S. Shoemaker || H || align=right | 2.8 km || 
|-id=737 bgcolor=#E9E9E9
| 4737 Kiladze ||  ||  || August 24, 1985 || Nauchnij || N. S. Chernykh || — || align=right | 8.8 km || 
|-id=738 bgcolor=#E9E9E9
| 4738 Jimihendrix ||  ||  || September 15, 1985 || Palomar || D. B. Goldstein || EUN || align=right | 8.2 km || 
|-id=739 bgcolor=#E9E9E9
| 4739 Tomahrens ||  ||  || October 15, 1985 || Anderson Mesa || E. Bowell || — || align=right | 7.0 km || 
|-id=740 bgcolor=#E9E9E9
| 4740 Veniamina ||  ||  || October 22, 1985 || Nauchnij || L. V. Zhuravleva || — || align=right | 11 km || 
|-id=741 bgcolor=#d6d6d6
| 4741 Leskov ||  ||  || November 10, 1985 || Nauchnij || L. G. Karachkina || — || align=right | 17 km || 
|-id=742 bgcolor=#fefefe
| 4742 Caliumi || 1986 WG ||  || November 26, 1986 || Bologna || San Vittore Obs. || PHO || align=right | 6.6 km || 
|-id=743 bgcolor=#fefefe
| 4743 Kikuchi || 1988 DA ||  || February 16, 1988 || Kitami || T. Fujii, K. Watanabe || FLO || align=right | 4.1 km || 
|-id=744 bgcolor=#E9E9E9
| 4744 Rovereto ||  ||  || September 2, 1988 || La Silla || H. Debehogne || — || align=right | 19 km || 
|-id=745 bgcolor=#d6d6d6
| 4745 Nancymarie ||  ||  || July 9, 1989 || Palomar || H. E. Holt || — || align=right | 13 km || 
|-id=746 bgcolor=#d6d6d6
| 4746 Doi ||  ||  || October 9, 1989 || Kitami || A. Takahashi, K. Watanabe || THM || align=right | 22 km || 
|-id=747 bgcolor=#d6d6d6
| 4747 Jujo || 1989 WB ||  || November 19, 1989 || Kushiro || S. Ueda, H. Kaneda || EOS || align=right | 14 km || 
|-id=748 bgcolor=#E9E9E9
| 4748 Tokiwagozen || 1989 WV ||  || November 20, 1989 || Toyota || K. Suzuki, T. Urata || — || align=right | 12 km || 
|-id=749 bgcolor=#d6d6d6
| 4749 Ledzeppelin ||  ||  || November 22, 1989 || Uenohara || N. Kawasato || EOS || align=right | 14 km || 
|-id=750 bgcolor=#fefefe
| 4750 Mukai ||  ||  || December 15, 1990 || Kitami || T. Fujii, K. Watanabe || FLO || align=right | 8.7 km || 
|-id=751 bgcolor=#d6d6d6
| 4751 Alicemanning || 1991 BG ||  || January 17, 1991 || Stakenbridge || B. G. W. Manning || — || align=right | 18 km || 
|-id=752 bgcolor=#d6d6d6
| 4752 Myron || 1309 T-2 ||  || September 29, 1973 || Palomar || PLS || THM || align=right | 12 km || 
|-id=753 bgcolor=#E9E9E9
| 4753 Phidias || 4059 T-3 ||  || October 16, 1977 || Palomar || PLS || — || align=right | 6.8 km || 
|-id=754 bgcolor=#C2FFFF
| 4754 Panthoos || 5010 T-3 ||  || October 16, 1977 || Palomar || PLS || L5 || align=right | 53 km || 
|-id=755 bgcolor=#fefefe
| 4755 Nicky ||  ||  || October 6, 1931 || Flagstaff || C. W. Tombaugh || — || align=right | 3.9 km || 
|-id=756 bgcolor=#d6d6d6
| 4756 Asaramas || 1950 HJ ||  || April 21, 1950 || La Plata Observatory || La Plata Obs. || EOS || align=right | 12 km || 
|-id=757 bgcolor=#d6d6d6
| 4757 Liselotte || 1973 ST ||  || September 19, 1973 || Palomar || PLS || 3:2 || align=right | 19 km || 
|-id=758 bgcolor=#d6d6d6
| 4758 Hermitage ||  ||  || September 27, 1978 || Nauchnij || L. I. Chernykh || THM || align=right | 19 km || 
|-id=759 bgcolor=#d6d6d6
| 4759 Åretta ||  ||  || November 7, 1978 || Palomar || E. F. Helin, S. J. Bus || THM || align=right | 16 km || 
|-id=760 bgcolor=#fefefe
| 4760 Jia-xiang ||  ||  || April 1, 1981 || Harvard Observatory || Harvard Obs. || — || align=right | 5.1 km || 
|-id=761 bgcolor=#fefefe
| 4761 Urrutia || 1981 QC ||  || August 27, 1981 || La Silla || H.-E. Schuster || PHO || align=right | 3.7 km || 
|-id=762 bgcolor=#fefefe
| 4762 Dobrynya ||  ||  || September 16, 1982 || Nauchnij || L. I. Chernykh || — || align=right | 5.9 km || 
|-id=763 bgcolor=#E9E9E9
| 4763 Ride || 1983 BM ||  || January 22, 1983 || Anderson Mesa || E. Bowell || — || align=right | 10 km || 
|-id=764 bgcolor=#fefefe
| 4764 Joneberhart || 1983 CC ||  || February 11, 1983 || Anderson Mesa || E. Bowell || H || align=right | 2.8 km || 
|-id=765 bgcolor=#fefefe
| 4765 Wasserburg ||  ||  || May 5, 1986 || Palomar || C. S. Shoemaker || Hmoon || align=right | 1.8 km || 
|-id=766 bgcolor=#E9E9E9
| 4766 Malin ||  ||  || March 28, 1987 || Palomar || E. F. Helin || EUN || align=right | 7.4 km || 
|-id=767 bgcolor=#E9E9E9
| 4767 Sutoku || 1987 GC ||  || April 4, 1987 || Ojima || T. Niijima, T. Urata || EUN || align=right | 7.9 km || 
|-id=768 bgcolor=#d6d6d6
| 4768 Hartley ||  ||  || August 11, 1988 || Siding Spring || A. J. Noymer || — || align=right | 34 km || 
|-id=769 bgcolor=#FFC2E0
| 4769 Castalia || 1989 PB ||  || August 9, 1989 || Palomar || E. F. Helin || APO +1kmPHA || align=right | 1.4 km || 
|-id=770 bgcolor=#d6d6d6
| 4770 Lane || 1989 PC ||  || August 9, 1989 || Palomar || E. F. Helin || — || align=right | 9.9 km || 
|-id=771 bgcolor=#E9E9E9
| 4771 Hayashi ||  ||  || September 7, 1989 || Kitami || M. Yanai, K. Watanabe || — || align=right | 13 km || 
|-id=772 bgcolor=#d6d6d6
| 4772 Frankdrake || 1989 VM ||  || November 2, 1989 || Okutama || T. Hioki, N. Kawasato || — || align=right | 28 km || 
|-id=773 bgcolor=#E9E9E9
| 4773 Hayakawa || 1989 WF ||  || November 17, 1989 || Kitami || K. Endate, K. Watanabe || — || align=right | 6.2 km || 
|-id=774 bgcolor=#fefefe
| 4774 Hobetsu ||  ||  || February 14, 1991 || Kushiro || S. Ueda, H. Kaneda || FLO || align=right | 5.0 km || 
|-id=775 bgcolor=#FA8072
| 4775 Hansen || 1927 TC ||  || October 3, 1927 || Heidelberg || M. F. Wolf || — || align=right | 4.9 km || 
|-id=776 bgcolor=#fefefe
| 4776 Luyi || 1975 VD ||  || November 3, 1975 || Harvard Observatory || Harvard Obs. || — || align=right | 3.6 km || 
|-id=777 bgcolor=#fefefe
| 4777 Aksenov ||  ||  || September 24, 1976 || Nauchnij || N. S. Chernykh || — || align=right | 3.9 km || 
|-id=778 bgcolor=#d6d6d6
| 4778 Fuss ||  ||  || October 9, 1978 || Nauchnij || L. V. Zhuravleva || THM || align=right | 13 km || 
|-id=779 bgcolor=#d6d6d6
| 4779 Whitley || 1978 XQ ||  || December 6, 1978 || Palomar || E. Bowell, A. Warnock || THM || align=right | 15 km || 
|-id=780 bgcolor=#fefefe
| 4780 Polina ||  ||  || April 25, 1979 || Nauchnij || N. S. Chernykh || — || align=right | 3.6 km || 
|-id=781 bgcolor=#fefefe
| 4781 Sládkovič || 1980 TP ||  || October 3, 1980 || Kleť || Z. Vávrová || — || align=right | 3.9 km || 
|-id=782 bgcolor=#d6d6d6
| 4782 Gembloux ||  ||  || October 14, 1980 || Haute-Provence || H. Debehogne, L. Houziaux || KOR || align=right | 12 km || 
|-id=783 bgcolor=#E9E9E9
| 4783 Wasson ||  ||  || January 12, 1983 || Palomar || C. S. Shoemaker || — || align=right | 7.2 km || 
|-id=784 bgcolor=#E9E9E9
| 4784 Samcarin ||  ||  || February 28, 1984 || La Silla || H. Debehogne || — || align=right | 6.0 km || 
|-id=785 bgcolor=#E9E9E9
| 4785 Petrov ||  ||  || December 17, 1984 || Nauchnij || L. G. Karachkina || — || align=right | 8.2 km || 
|-id=786 bgcolor=#fefefe
| 4786 Tatianina ||  ||  || August 13, 1985 || Nauchnij || N. S. Chernykh || moon || align=right | 3.3 km || 
|-id=787 bgcolor=#fefefe
| 4787 Shulʹzhenko ||  ||  || September 6, 1986 || Nauchnij || L. V. Zhuravleva || — || align=right | 5.0 km || 
|-id=788 bgcolor=#fefefe
| 4788 Simpson ||  ||  || October 4, 1986 || Anderson Mesa || E. Bowell || moon || align=right | 3.6 km || 
|-id=789 bgcolor=#fefefe
| 4789 Sprattia ||  ||  || October 20, 1987 || Climenhaga || D. D. Balam || — || align=right | 4.2 km || 
|-id=790 bgcolor=#E9E9E9
| 4790 Petrpravec || 1988 PP ||  || August 9, 1988 || Palomar || E. F. Helin || — || align=right | 16 km || 
|-id=791 bgcolor=#C2FFFF
| 4791 Iphidamas ||  ||  || August 14, 1988 || Palomar || C. S. Shoemaker || L5 || align=right | 50 km || 
|-id=792 bgcolor=#C2FFFF
| 4792 Lykaon ||  ||  || September 10, 1988 || Palomar || C. S. Shoemaker || L5 || align=right | 51 km || 
|-id=793 bgcolor=#E9E9E9
| 4793 Slessor ||  ||  || September 1, 1988 || La Silla || H. Debehogne || VIB || align=right | 13 km || 
|-id=794 bgcolor=#fefefe
| 4794 Bogard ||  ||  || September 16, 1988 || Cerro Tololo || S. J. Bus || FLO || align=right | 4.4 km || 
|-id=795 bgcolor=#fefefe
| 4795 Kihara ||  ||  || February 7, 1989 || Kitami || A. Takahashi, K. Watanabe || FLO || align=right | 4.1 km || 
|-id=796 bgcolor=#fefefe
| 4796 Lewis || 1989 LU ||  || June 3, 1989 || Palomar || E. F. Helin || — || align=right | 5.5 km || 
|-id=797 bgcolor=#fefefe
| 4797 Ako || 1989 SJ ||  || September 30, 1989 || Minami-Oda || T. Nomura, K. Kawanishi || NYS || align=right | 6.0 km || 
|-id=798 bgcolor=#fefefe
| 4798 Mercator ||  ||  || September 26, 1989 || La Silla || E. W. Elst || — || align=right | 5.0 km || 
|-id=799 bgcolor=#fefefe
| 4799 Hirasawa ||  ||  || October 8, 1989 || Kani || Y. Mizuno, T. Furuta || — || align=right | 7.9 km || 
|-id=800 bgcolor=#d6d6d6
| 4800 Veveri ||  ||  || October 9, 1989 || La Silla || H. Debehogne || EOS || align=right | 14 km || 
|}

4801–4900 

|-bgcolor=#E9E9E9
| 4801 Ohře ||  ||  || October 22, 1989 || Kleť || A. Mrkos || — || align=right | 14 km || 
|-id=802 bgcolor=#fefefe
| 4802 Khatchaturian ||  ||  || October 23, 1989 || Tautenburg Observatory || F. Börngen || — || align=right | 2.3 km || 
|-id=803 bgcolor=#d6d6d6
| 4803 Birkle || 1989 XA ||  || December 1, 1989 || Chions || J. M. Baur || KOR || align=right | 10 km || 
|-id=804 bgcolor=#E9E9E9
| 4804 Pasteur ||  ||  || December 2, 1989 || La Silla || E. W. Elst || — || align=right | 15 km || 
|-id=805 bgcolor=#C2FFFF
| 4805 Asteropaios ||  ||  || November 13, 1990 || Palomar || C. S. Shoemaker || L5 || align=right | 58 km || 
|-id=806 bgcolor=#fefefe
| 4806 Miho || 1990 YJ ||  || December 22, 1990 || Yakiimo || A. Natori, T. Urata || FLO || align=right | 5.7 km || 
|-id=807 bgcolor=#fefefe
| 4807 Noboru || 1991 AO ||  || January 10, 1991 || Oizumi || T. Kobayashi || — || align=right | 4.7 km || 
|-id=808 bgcolor=#E9E9E9
| 4808 Ballaero || 1925 BA ||  || January 21, 1925 || Heidelberg || K. Reinmuth || ADE || align=right | 19 km || 
|-id=809 bgcolor=#E9E9E9
| 4809 Robertball || 1928 RB ||  || September 5, 1928 || Heidelberg || M. F. Wolf || — || align=right | 6.4 km || 
|-id=810 bgcolor=#fefefe
| 4810 Ruslanova || 1972 GL ||  || April 14, 1972 || Nauchnij || L. I. Chernykh || — || align=right | 6.3 km || 
|-id=811 bgcolor=#fefefe
| 4811 Semashko ||  ||  || September 25, 1973 || Nauchnij || L. V. Zhuravleva || FLO || align=right | 3.8 km || 
|-id=812 bgcolor=#fefefe
| 4812 Hakuhou ||  ||  || February 18, 1977 || Kiso || H. Kosai, K. Furukawa || ERI || align=right | 6.8 km || 
|-id=813 bgcolor=#d6d6d6
| 4813 Terebizh ||  ||  || September 11, 1977 || Nauchnij || N. S. Chernykh || — || align=right | 18 km || 
|-id=814 bgcolor=#d6d6d6
| 4814 Casacci || 1978 RW ||  || September 1, 1978 || Nauchnij || N. S. Chernykh || — || align=right | 14 km || 
|-id=815 bgcolor=#fefefe
| 4815 Anders ||  ||  || March 2, 1981 || Siding Spring || S. J. Bus || V || align=right | 4.2 km || 
|-id=816 bgcolor=#E9E9E9
| 4816 Connelly || 1981 PK ||  || August 3, 1981 || Anderson Mesa || E. Bowell || — || align=right | 7.2 km || 
|-id=817 bgcolor=#fefefe
| 4817 Gliba ||  ||  || February 27, 1984 || La Silla || H. Debehogne || NYS || align=right | 3.8 km || 
|-id=818 bgcolor=#fefefe
| 4818 Elgar || 1984 EM ||  || March 1, 1984 || Anderson Mesa || E. Bowell || NYS || align=right | 4.4 km || 
|-id=819 bgcolor=#fefefe
| 4819 Gifford || 1985 KC ||  || May 24, 1985 || Lake Tekapo || A. C. Gilmore, P. M. Kilmartin || — || align=right | 3.8 km || 
|-id=820 bgcolor=#d6d6d6
| 4820 Fay || 1985 RZ ||  || September 15, 1985 || Palomar || C. S. Shoemaker || — || align=right | 8.6 km || 
|-id=821 bgcolor=#d6d6d6
| 4821 Bianucci ||  ||  || March 5, 1986 || La Silla || W. Ferreri || THM || align=right | 15 km || 
|-id=822 bgcolor=#fefefe
| 4822 Karge ||  ||  || October 4, 1986 || Anderson Mesa || E. Bowell || — || align=right | 4.3 km || 
|-id=823 bgcolor=#fefefe
| 4823 Libenice ||  ||  || October 4, 1986 || Kleť || A. Mrkos || — || align=right | 4.1 km || 
|-id=824 bgcolor=#fefefe
| 4824 Stradonice ||  ||  || November 25, 1986 || Kleť || A. Mrkos || — || align=right | 4.1 km || 
|-id=825 bgcolor=#fefefe
| 4825 Ventura ||  ||  || February 11, 1988 || La Silla || E. W. Elst || FLO || align=right | 3.8 km || 
|-id=826 bgcolor=#fefefe
| 4826 Wilhelms || 1988 JO ||  || May 11, 1988 || Palomar || C. S. Shoemaker || PHO || align=right | 7.9 km || 
|-id=827 bgcolor=#C2FFFF
| 4827 Dares || 1988 QE ||  || August 17, 1988 || Palomar || C. S. Shoemaker || L5 || align=right | 43 km || 
|-id=828 bgcolor=#C2FFFF
| 4828 Misenus || 1988 RV ||  || September 11, 1988 || Palomar || C. S. Shoemaker || L5 || align=right | 46 km || 
|-id=829 bgcolor=#C2FFFF
| 4829 Sergestus ||  ||  || September 10, 1988 || Palomar || C. S. Shoemaker || L5 || align=right | 32 km || 
|-id=830 bgcolor=#fefefe
| 4830 Thomascooley ||  ||  || September 1, 1988 || La Silla || H. Debehogne || V || align=right | 5.7 km || 
|-id=831 bgcolor=#d6d6d6
| 4831 Baldwin ||  ||  || September 14, 1988 || Cerro Tololo || S. J. Bus || THM || align=right | 18 km || 
|-id=832 bgcolor=#C2FFFF
| 4832 Palinurus ||  ||  || October 12, 1988 || Palomar || C. S. Shoemaker || L5 || align=right | 52 km || 
|-id=833 bgcolor=#C2FFFF
| 4833 Meges ||  ||  || January 8, 1989 || Palomar || C. S. Shoemaker || L4 || align=right | 80 km || 
|-id=834 bgcolor=#C2FFFF
| 4834 Thoas ||  ||  || January 11, 1989 || Palomar || C. S. Shoemaker || L4 || align=right | 72 km || 
|-id=835 bgcolor=#C2FFFF
| 4835 Asaeus || 1989 BQ ||  || January 29, 1989 || Tokushima || M. Iwamoto, T. Furuta || L4 || align=right | 30 km || 
|-id=836 bgcolor=#C2FFFF
| 4836 Medon ||  ||  || February 2, 1989 || Palomar || C. S. Shoemaker || L4 || align=right | 63 km || 
|-id=837 bgcolor=#d6d6d6
| 4837 Bickerton || 1989 ME ||  || June 30, 1989 || Lake Tekapo || A. C. Gilmore, P. M. Kilmartin || Tj (2.99) || align=right | 28 km || 
|-id=838 bgcolor=#fefefe
| 4838 Billmclaughlin || 1989 NJ ||  || July 2, 1989 || Palomar || E. F. Helin || — || align=right | 10 km || 
|-id=839 bgcolor=#fefefe
| 4839 Daisetsuzan || 1989 QG ||  || August 25, 1989 || Kitami || K. Endate, K. Watanabe || — || align=right | 8.1 km || 
|-id=840 bgcolor=#d6d6d6
| 4840 Otaynang || 1989 UY ||  || October 23, 1989 || Gekko || Y. Oshima || URS || align=right | 21 km || 
|-id=841 bgcolor=#fefefe
| 4841 Manjiro ||  ||  || October 28, 1989 || Geisei || T. Seki || FLO || align=right | 5.3 km || 
|-id=842 bgcolor=#fefefe
| 4842 Atsushi || 1989 WK ||  || November 21, 1989 || Kushiro || S. Ueda, H. Kaneda || — || align=right | 4.6 km || 
|-id=843 bgcolor=#d6d6d6
| 4843 Mégantic ||  ||  || February 28, 1990 || La Silla || H. Debehogne || EOS || align=right | 27 km || 
|-id=844 bgcolor=#E9E9E9
| 4844 Matsuyama ||  ||  || January 23, 1991 || Kushiro || S. Ueda, H. Kaneda || — || align=right | 7.6 km || 
|-id=845 bgcolor=#fefefe
| 4845 Tsubetsu ||  ||  || March 5, 1991 || Kitami || K. Endate, K. Watanabe || — || align=right | 7.8 km || 
|-id=846 bgcolor=#d6d6d6
| 4846 Tuthmosis || 6575 P-L ||  || September 24, 1960 || Palomar || PLS || — || align=right | 12 km || 
|-id=847 bgcolor=#fefefe
| 4847 Amenhotep || 6787 P-L ||  || September 24, 1960 || Palomar || PLS || — || align=right | 3.1 km || 
|-id=848 bgcolor=#d6d6d6
| 4848 Tutenchamun || 3233 T-2 ||  || September 30, 1973 || Palomar || PLS || HYG || align=right | 22 km || 
|-id=849 bgcolor=#fefefe
| 4849 Ardenne || 1936 QV ||  || August 17, 1936 || Heidelberg || K. Reinmuth || — || align=right | 4.2 km || 
|-id=850 bgcolor=#d6d6d6
| 4850 Palestrina ||  ||  || October 27, 1973 || Tautenburg Observatory || F. Börngen || KOR || align=right | 7.6 km || 
|-id=851 bgcolor=#E9E9E9
| 4851 Vodopʹyanova ||  ||  || October 26, 1976 || Nauchnij || T. M. Smirnova || — || align=right | 11 km || 
|-id=852 bgcolor=#fefefe
| 4852 Pamjones || 1977 JD ||  || May 15, 1977 || Nauchnij || N. S. Chernykh || V || align=right | 3.7 km || 
|-id=853 bgcolor=#E9E9E9
| 4853 Marielukac || 1979 ML ||  || June 28, 1979 || Cerro El Roble || C. Torres || — || align=right | 6.2 km || 
|-id=854 bgcolor=#d6d6d6
| 4854 Edscott ||  ||  || March 2, 1981 || Siding Spring || S. J. Bus || EOS || align=right | 10 km || 
|-id=855 bgcolor=#fefefe
| 4855 Tenpyou ||  ||  || November 14, 1982 || Kiso || H. Kosai, K. Furukawa || — || align=right | 4.0 km || 
|-id=856 bgcolor=#E9E9E9
| 4856 Seaborg || 1983 LJ ||  || June 11, 1983 || Palomar || C. S. Shoemaker || — || align=right | 10 km || 
|-id=857 bgcolor=#fefefe
| 4857 Altgamia || 1984 FM ||  || March 29, 1984 || Palomar || C. S. Shoemaker || PHO || align=right | 6.2 km || 
|-id=858 bgcolor=#fefefe
| 4858 Vorobjov || 1985 UA ||  || October 23, 1985 || Palomar || J. Gibson || — || align=right | 3.3 km || 
|-id=859 bgcolor=#fefefe
| 4859 Fraknoi ||  ||  || October 7, 1986 || Anderson Mesa || E. Bowell || FLO || align=right | 7.1 km || 
|-id=860 bgcolor=#E9E9E9
| 4860 Gubbio || 1987 EP ||  || March 3, 1987 || Anderson Mesa || E. Bowell || MAR || align=right | 26 km || 
|-id=861 bgcolor=#d6d6d6
| 4861 Nemirovskij ||  ||  || August 27, 1987 || Nauchnij || L. G. Karachkina || — || align=right | 6.6 km || 
|-id=862 bgcolor=#d6d6d6
| 4862 Loke ||  ||  || September 30, 1987 || Brorfelde || P. Jensen || — || align=right | 6.6 km || 
|-id=863 bgcolor=#d6d6d6
| 4863 Yasutani ||  ||  || November 13, 1987 || Kushiro || S. Ueda, H. Kaneda || KOR || align=right | 9.8 km || 
|-id=864 bgcolor=#fefefe
| 4864 Nimoy ||  ||  || September 2, 1988 || La Silla || H. Debehogne || — || align=right | 12 km || 
|-id=865 bgcolor=#d6d6d6
| 4865 Sor || 1988 UJ ||  || October 18, 1988 || Geisei || T. Seki || EOS || align=right | 11 km || 
|-id=866 bgcolor=#d6d6d6
| 4866 Badillo ||  ||  || November 10, 1988 || Chiyoda || T. Kojima || — || align=right | 13 km || 
|-id=867 bgcolor=#C2FFFF
| 4867 Polites || 1989 SZ ||  || September 27, 1989 || Palomar || C. S. Shoemaker || L5 || align=right | 57 km || 
|-id=868 bgcolor=#fefefe
| 4868 Knushevia ||  ||  || October 27, 1989 || Palomar || E. F. Helin || Hmoon || align=right | 1.5 km || 
|-id=869 bgcolor=#fefefe
| 4869 Piotrovsky ||  ||  || October 26, 1989 || Nauchnij || L. I. Chernykh || — || align=right | 6.3 km || 
|-id=870 bgcolor=#d6d6d6
| 4870 Shcherbanʹ ||  ||  || October 25, 1989 || Nauchnij || L. V. Zhuravleva || — || align=right | 20 km || 
|-id=871 bgcolor=#fefefe
| 4871 Riverside ||  ||  || November 24, 1989 || Ayashi Station || M. Koishikawa || — || align=right | 5.1 km || 
|-id=872 bgcolor=#E9E9E9
| 4872 Grieg ||  ||  || December 25, 1989 || Tautenburg Observatory || F. Börngen || — || align=right | 7.6 km || 
|-id=873 bgcolor=#d6d6d6
| 4873 Fukaya || 1990 EC ||  || March 4, 1990 || Dynic || A. Sugie || EOS || align=right | 12 km || 
|-id=874 bgcolor=#E9E9E9
| 4874 Burke || 1991 AW ||  || January 12, 1991 || Palomar || E. F. Helin || EUN || align=right | 9.3 km || 
|-id=875 bgcolor=#fefefe
| 4875 Ingalls || 1991 DJ ||  || February 19, 1991 || Yatsugatake || Y. Kushida, R. Kushida || FLO || align=right | 5.5 km || 
|-id=876 bgcolor=#d6d6d6
| 4876 Strabo || 1133 T-2 ||  || September 29, 1973 || Palomar || PLS || KOR || align=right | 7.6 km || 
|-id=877 bgcolor=#E9E9E9
| 4877 Humboldt || 5066 T-2 ||  || September 25, 1973 || Palomar || PLS || EUN || align=right | 6.8 km || 
|-id=878 bgcolor=#fefefe
| 4878 Gilhutton || 1968 OF ||  || July 18, 1968 || Cerro El Roble || C. Torres, S. Cofré || V || align=right | 2.6 km || 
|-id=879 bgcolor=#d6d6d6
| 4879 Zykina || 1974 VG ||  || November 12, 1974 || Nauchnij || L. I. Chernykh || — || align=right | 13 km || 
|-id=880 bgcolor=#E9E9E9
| 4880 Tovstonogov ||  ||  || October 14, 1975 || Nauchnij || L. I. Chernykh || HNS || align=right | 8.9 km || 
|-id=881 bgcolor=#fefefe
| 4881 Robmackintosh || 1975 XJ ||  || December 1, 1975 || Cerro El Roble || C. Torres || — || align=right | 3.0 km || 
|-id=882 bgcolor=#fefefe
| 4882 Divari ||  ||  || August 21, 1977 || Nauchnij || N. S. Chernykh || — || align=right | 5.2 km || 
|-id=883 bgcolor=#E9E9E9
| 4883 Korolirina ||  ||  || September 5, 1978 || Nauchnij || N. S. Chernykh || — || align=right | 8.3 km || 
|-id=884 bgcolor=#fefefe
| 4884 Bragaria ||  ||  || July 21, 1979 || Nauchnij || N. S. Chernykh || FLO || align=right | 4.0 km || 
|-id=885 bgcolor=#fefefe
| 4885 Grange || 1980 LU ||  || June 10, 1980 || Palomar || C. S. Shoemaker || NYS || align=right | 4.8 km || 
|-id=886 bgcolor=#d6d6d6
| 4886 Kojima ||  ||  || March 1, 1981 || Siding Spring || S. J. Bus || — || align=right | 7.6 km || 
|-id=887 bgcolor=#d6d6d6
| 4887 Takihiroi ||  ||  || March 2, 1981 || Siding Spring || S. J. Bus || — || align=right | 11 km || 
|-id=888 bgcolor=#fefefe
| 4888 Doreen ||  ||  || May 5, 1981 || Palomar || C. S. Shoemaker || — || align=right | 4.3 km || 
|-id=889 bgcolor=#d6d6d6
| 4889 Praetorius ||  ||  || October 19, 1982 || Tautenburg Observatory || F. Börngen || MEL || align=right | 21 km || 
|-id=890 bgcolor=#fefefe
| 4890 Shikanosima ||  ||  || November 14, 1982 || Kiso || H. Kosai, K. Furukawa || — || align=right | 4.7 km || 
|-id=891 bgcolor=#d6d6d6
| 4891 Blaga || 1984 GR ||  || April 4, 1984 || Smolyan || Bulgarian National Obs. || — || align=right | 21 km || 
|-id=892 bgcolor=#fefefe
| 4892 Chrispollas ||  ||  || October 11, 1985 || Caussols || CERGA || — || align=right | 7.3 km || 
|-id=893 bgcolor=#d6d6d6
| 4893 Seitter ||  ||  || August 9, 1986 || Smolyan || E. W. Elst, V. G. Ivanova || — || align=right | 19 km || 
|-id=894 bgcolor=#fefefe
| 4894 Ask || 1986 RJ ||  || September 8, 1986 || Brorfelde || P. Jensen || — || align=right | 5.0 km || 
|-id=895 bgcolor=#fefefe
| 4895 Embla ||  ||  || October 13, 1986 || Brorfelde || P. Jensen || — || align=right | 5.3 km || 
|-id=896 bgcolor=#d6d6d6
| 4896 Tomoegozen || 1986 YA ||  || December 20, 1986 || Ojima || T. Niijima, T. Urata || — || align=right | 29 km || 
|-id=897 bgcolor=#d6d6d6
| 4897 Tomhamilton ||  ||  || August 22, 1987 || Palomar || E. F. Helin || — || align=right | 14 km || 
|-id=898 bgcolor=#fefefe
| 4898 Nishiizumi || 1988 FJ ||  || March 19, 1988 || Palomar || C. S. Shoemaker || H || align=right | 2.2 km || 
|-id=899 bgcolor=#fefefe
| 4899 Candace || 1988 JU ||  || May 9, 1988 || Palomar || C. S. Shoemaker, E. M. Shoemaker || — || align=right | 6.5 km || 
|-id=900 bgcolor=#fefefe
| 4900 Maymelou || 1988 ME ||  || June 16, 1988 || Palomar || E. F. Helin || V || align=right | 4.7 km || 
|}

4901–5000 

|-bgcolor=#fefefe
| 4901 Ó Briain || 1988 VJ ||  || November 3, 1988 || Yorii || M. Arai, H. Mori || FLO || align=right | 5.2 km || 
|-id=902 bgcolor=#C2FFFF
| 4902 Thessandrus ||  ||  || January 9, 1989 || Palomar || C. S. Shoemaker || L4slow || align=right | 51 km || 
|-id=903 bgcolor=#d6d6d6
| 4903 Ichikawa || 1989 UD ||  || October 20, 1989 || Kani || Y. Mizuno, T. Furuta || THM || align=right | 15 km || 
|-id=904 bgcolor=#fefefe
| 4904 Makio || 1989 WZ ||  || November 21, 1989 || Kani || Y. Mizuno, T. Furuta || — || align=right | 7.0 km || 
|-id=905 bgcolor=#E9E9E9
| 4905 Hiromi ||  ||  || May 15, 1991 || Kitami || A. Takahashi, K. Watanabe || — || align=right | 8.4 km || 
|-id=906 bgcolor=#fefefe
| 4906 Seneferu || 2533 P-L ||  || September 24, 1960 || Palomar || PLS || — || align=right | 3.1 km || 
|-id=907 bgcolor=#d6d6d6
| 4907 Zoser || 7618 P-L ||  || October 17, 1960 || Palomar || PLS || — || align=right | 21 km || 
|-id=908 bgcolor=#fefefe
| 4908 Ward || 1933 SD ||  || September 17, 1933 || Uccle || F. Rigaux || — || align=right | 4.9 km || 
|-id=909 bgcolor=#fefefe
| 4909 Couteau ||  ||  || September 28, 1949 || Nice || M. Laugier || — || align=right | 5.3 km || 
|-id=910 bgcolor=#FA8072
| 4910 Kawasato || 1953 PR ||  || August 11, 1953 || Heidelberg || K. Reinmuth || — || align=right | 4.3 km || 
|-id=911 bgcolor=#E9E9E9
| 4911 Rosenzweig || 1953 UD ||  || October 16, 1953 || Brooklyn || Indiana University || EUN || align=right | 10 km || 
|-id=912 bgcolor=#fefefe
| 4912 Emilhaury ||  ||  || November 11, 1953 || Brooklyn || Indiana University || FLO || align=right | 6.5 km || 
|-id=913 bgcolor=#fefefe
| 4913 Wangxuan || 1965 SO ||  || September 20, 1965 || Nanking || Purple Mountain Obs. || NYS || align=right | 6.0 km || 
|-id=914 bgcolor=#E9E9E9
| 4914 Pardina || 1969 GD ||  || April 9, 1969 || El Leoncito || Félix Aguilar Obs. || EUN || align=right | 11 km || 
|-id=915 bgcolor=#d6d6d6
| 4915 Solzhenitsyn ||  ||  || October 8, 1969 || Nauchnij || L. I. Chernykh || — || align=right | 12 km || 
|-id=916 bgcolor=#d6d6d6
| 4916 Brumberg || 1970 PS ||  || August 10, 1970 || Nauchnij || Crimean Astrophysical Obs. || — || align=right | 17 km || 
|-id=917 bgcolor=#E9E9E9
| 4917 Yurilvovia ||  ||  || September 28, 1973 || Nauchnij || Crimean Astrophysical Obs. || — || align=right | 8.4 km || 
|-id=918 bgcolor=#E9E9E9
| 4918 Rostropovich ||  ||  || August 24, 1974 || Nauchnij || L. I. Chernykh || — || align=right | 12 km || 
|-id=919 bgcolor=#fefefe
| 4919 Vishnevskaya ||  ||  || September 19, 1974 || Nauchnij || L. I. Chernykh || — || align=right | 3.0 km || 
|-id=920 bgcolor=#E9E9E9
| 4920 Gromov ||  ||  || August 8, 1978 || Nauchnij || N. S. Chernykh || HEN || align=right | 7.0 km || 
|-id=921 bgcolor=#fefefe
| 4921 Volonté || 1980 SJ ||  || September 29, 1980 || Kleť || Z. Vávrová || V || align=right | 5.1 km || 
|-id=922 bgcolor=#E9E9E9
| 4922 Leshin ||  ||  || March 2, 1981 || Siding Spring || S. J. Bus || — || align=right | 5.0 km || 
|-id=923 bgcolor=#fefefe
| 4923 Clarke ||  ||  || March 2, 1981 || Siding Spring || S. J. Bus || — || align=right | 3.4 km || 
|-id=924 bgcolor=#fefefe
| 4924 Hiltner ||  ||  || March 2, 1981 || Siding Spring || S. J. Bus || — || align=right | 2.3 km || 
|-id=925 bgcolor=#d6d6d6
| 4925 Zhoushan ||  ||  || December 3, 1981 || Nanking || Purple Mountain Obs. || — || align=right | 14 km || 
|-id=926 bgcolor=#d6d6d6
| 4926 Smoktunovskij ||  ||  || September 16, 1982 || Nauchnij || L. I. Chernykh || KOR || align=right | 7.1 km || 
|-id=927 bgcolor=#d6d6d6
| 4927 O'Connell ||  ||  || October 21, 1982 || Kleť || Z. Vávrová || KOR || align=right | 7.0 km || 
|-id=928 bgcolor=#fefefe
| 4928 Vermeer ||  ||  || October 21, 1982 || Nauchnij || L. G. Karachkina || — || align=right | 4.1 km || 
|-id=929 bgcolor=#fefefe
| 4929 Yamatai || 1982 XV ||  || December 13, 1982 || Kiso || H. Kosai, K. Furukawa || — || align=right | 4.0 km || 
|-id=930 bgcolor=#d6d6d6
| 4930 Rephiltim ||  ||  || January 10, 1983 || Palomar || S. L. Salyards || — || align=right | 36 km || 
|-id=931 bgcolor=#E9E9E9
| 4931 Tomsk ||  ||  || February 11, 1983 || La Silla || H. Debehogne, G. DeSanctis || — || align=right | 7.6 km || 
|-id=932 bgcolor=#d6d6d6
| 4932 Texstapa ||  ||  || March 9, 1984 || Anderson Mesa || B. A. Skiff || — || align=right | 26 km || 
|-id=933 bgcolor=#fefefe
| 4933 Tylerlinder ||  ||  || March 2, 1984 || La Silla || H. Debehogne || — || align=right | 5.3 km || 
|-id=934 bgcolor=#d6d6d6
| 4934 Rhôneranger || 1985 JJ ||  || May 15, 1985 || Anderson Mesa || E. Bowell || EOS || align=right | 12 km || 
|-id=935 bgcolor=#fefefe
| 4935 Maslachkova ||  ||  || August 13, 1985 || Nauchnij || N. S. Chernykh || FLO || align=right | 5.3 km || 
|-id=936 bgcolor=#fefefe
| 4936 Butakov ||  ||  || October 22, 1985 || Nauchnij || L. V. Zhuravleva || FLO || align=right | 4.5 km || 
|-id=937 bgcolor=#E9E9E9
| 4937 Lintott ||  ||  || February 1, 1986 || La Silla || H. Debehogne || GER || align=right | 9.8 km || 
|-id=938 bgcolor=#fefefe
| 4938 Papadopoulos ||  ||  || February 5, 1986 || La Silla || H. Debehogne || — || align=right | 5.1 km || 
|-id=939 bgcolor=#E9E9E9
| 4939 Scovil ||  ||  || August 27, 1986 || La Silla || H. Debehogne || — || align=right | 5.2 km || 
|-id=940 bgcolor=#d6d6d6
| 4940 Polenov ||  ||  || August 18, 1986 || Nauchnij || L. G. Karachkina || THM || align=right | 18 km || 
|-id=941 bgcolor=#d6d6d6
| 4941 Yahagi || 1986 UA ||  || October 25, 1986 || Toyota || K. Suzuki, T. Urata || THM || align=right | 18 km || 
|-id=942 bgcolor=#fefefe
| 4942 Munroe ||  ||  || February 24, 1987 || La Silla || H. Debehogne || — || align=right | 3.5 km || 
|-id=943 bgcolor=#E9E9E9
| 4943 Lac d'Orient || 1987 OQ ||  || July 27, 1987 || Haute-Provence || E. W. Elst || EUN || align=right | 6.4 km || 
|-id=944 bgcolor=#E9E9E9
| 4944 Kozlovskij ||  ||  || September 2, 1987 || Nauchnij || L. I. Chernykh || WIT || align=right | 11 km || 
|-id=945 bgcolor=#E9E9E9
| 4945 Ikenozenni || 1987 SJ ||  || September 18, 1987 || Toyota || K. Suzuki, T. Urata || — || align=right | 7.4 km || 
|-id=946 bgcolor=#C2FFFF
| 4946 Askalaphus ||  ||  || January 21, 1988 || Palomar || C. S. Shoemaker, E. M. Shoemaker || L4 || align=right | 48 km || 
|-id=947 bgcolor=#FFC2E0
| 4947 Ninkasi ||  ||  || October 12, 1988 || Palomar || C. S. Shoemaker || AMO +1km || align=right data-sort-value="0.89" | 890 m || 
|-id=948 bgcolor=#fefefe
| 4948 Hideonishimura ||  ||  || November 3, 1988 || Oohira || Oohira Stn. || — || align=right | 3.9 km || 
|-id=949 bgcolor=#fefefe
| 4949 Akasofu || 1988 WE ||  || November 29, 1988 || Chiyoda || T. Kojima || FLO || align=right | 4.5 km || 
|-id=950 bgcolor=#E9E9E9
| 4950 House ||  ||  || December 7, 1988 || Palomar || E. F. Helin || — || align=right | 7.3 km || 
|-id=951 bgcolor=#fefefe
| 4951 Iwamoto || 1990 BM ||  || January 21, 1990 || Kani || Y. Mizuno, T. Furuta || moonslow || align=right | 5.2 km || 
|-id=952 bgcolor=#d6d6d6
| 4952 Kibeshigemaro ||  ||  || March 26, 1990 || Dynic || A. Sugie || — || align=right | 19 km || 
|-id=953 bgcolor=#FFC2E0
| 4953 || 1990 MU || — || June 23, 1990 || Siding Spring || R. H. McNaught || APO +1kmPHA || align=right | 3.5 km || 
|-id=954 bgcolor=#FFC2E0
| 4954 Eric || 1990 SQ ||  || September 23, 1990 || Palomar || B. Roman || AMO +1km || align=right | 11 km || 
|-id=955 bgcolor=#d6d6d6
| 4955 Gold ||  ||  || September 17, 1990 || Palomar || H. E. Holt || HYG || align=right | 20 km || 
|-id=956 bgcolor=#fefefe
| 4956 Noymer ||  ||  || November 12, 1990 || Siding Spring || R. H. McNaught || — || align=right | 5.6 km || 
|-id=957 bgcolor=#FFC2E0
| 4957 Brucemurray || 1990 XJ ||  || December 15, 1990 || Palomar || E. F. Helin || AMO +1km || align=right | 3.5 km || 
|-id=958 bgcolor=#d6d6d6
| 4958 Wellnitz ||  ||  || July 13, 1991 || Palomar || H. E. Holt || EOS || align=right | 16 km || 
|-id=959 bgcolor=#d6d6d6
| 4959 Niinoama ||  ||  || August 15, 1991 || Yakiimo || A. Natori, T. Urata || — || align=right | 36 km || 
|-id=960 bgcolor=#d6d6d6
| 4960 Mayo || 4657 P-L ||  || September 24, 1960 || Palomar || PLS || — || align=right | 11 km || 
|-id=961 bgcolor=#d6d6d6
| 4961 Timherder ||  ||  || October 8, 1958 || Flagstaff || Lowell Obs. || — || align=right | 11 km || 
|-id=962 bgcolor=#E9E9E9
| 4962 Vecherka || 1973 TP ||  || October 1, 1973 || Nauchnij || T. M. Smirnova || slow || align=right | 10 km || 
|-id=963 bgcolor=#E9E9E9
| 4963 Kanroku ||  ||  || February 18, 1977 || Kiso || H. Kosai, K. Furukawa || EUN || align=right | 11 km || 
|-id=964 bgcolor=#fefefe
| 4964 Kourovka ||  ||  || July 21, 1979 || Nauchnij || N. S. Chernykh || — || align=right | 4.4 km || 
|-id=965 bgcolor=#d6d6d6
| 4965 Takeda ||  ||  || March 6, 1981 || Siding Spring || S. J. Bus || KOR || align=right | 4.8 km || 
|-id=966 bgcolor=#E9E9E9
| 4966 Edolsen ||  ||  || March 2, 1981 || Siding Spring || S. J. Bus || — || align=right | 10 km || 
|-id=967 bgcolor=#d6d6d6
| 4967 Glia ||  ||  || February 11, 1983 || Anderson Mesa || N. G. Thomas || — || align=right | 30 km || 
|-id=968 bgcolor=#E9E9E9
| 4968 Suzamur || 1986 PQ ||  || August 1, 1986 || Palomar || E. F. Helin || — || align=right | 6.7 km || 
|-id=969 bgcolor=#E9E9E9
| 4969 Lawrence || 1986 TU ||  || October 4, 1986 || Palomar || E. F. Helin || PAL || align=right | 6.7 km || 
|-id=970 bgcolor=#fefefe
| 4970 Druyan ||  ||  || November 12, 1988 || Palomar || E. F. Helin || — || align=right | 8.1 km || 
|-id=971 bgcolor=#fefefe
| 4971 Hoshinohiroba || 1989 BY ||  || January 30, 1989 || Kitami || T. Fujii, K. Watanabe || NYS || align=right | 4.7 km || 
|-id=972 bgcolor=#d6d6d6
| 4972 Pachelbel ||  ||  || October 23, 1989 || Tautenburg Observatory || F. Börngen || THM || align=right | 12 km || 
|-id=973 bgcolor=#d6d6d6
| 4973 Showa || 1990 FT ||  || March 18, 1990 || Kitami || K. Endate, K. Watanabe || 7:4 || align=right | 28 km || 
|-id=974 bgcolor=#E9E9E9
| 4974 Elford || 1990 LA ||  || June 14, 1990 || Siding Spring || R. H. McNaught || EUN || align=right | 8.2 km || 
|-id=975 bgcolor=#d6d6d6
| 4975 Dohmoto ||  ||  || September 16, 1990 || Kitami || T. Fujii, K. Watanabe || — || align=right | 18 km || 
|-id=976 bgcolor=#d6d6d6
| 4976 Choukyongchol || 1991 PM ||  || August 9, 1991 || JCPM Sapporo || K. Watanabe || EOS || align=right | 17 km || 
|-id=977 bgcolor=#fefefe
| 4977 Rauthgundis || 2018 P-L ||  || September 24, 1960 || Palomar || PLS || V || align=right | 3.9 km || 
|-id=978 bgcolor=#E9E9E9
| 4978 Seitz || 4069 T-2 ||  || September 29, 1973 || Palomar || PLS || — || align=right | 5.2 km || 
|-id=979 bgcolor=#fefefe
| 4979 Otawara || 1949 PQ ||  || August 2, 1949 || Heidelberg || K. Reinmuth || — || align=right | 3.2 km || 
|-id=980 bgcolor=#d6d6d6
| 4980 Magomaev ||  ||  || September 19, 1974 || Nauchnij || L. I. Chernykh || THM || align=right | 17 km || 
|-id=981 bgcolor=#d6d6d6
| 4981 Sinyavskaya || 1974 VS ||  || November 12, 1974 || Nauchnij || L. I. Chernykh || KOR || align=right | 9.2 km || 
|-id=982 bgcolor=#E9E9E9
| 4982 Bartini ||  ||  || August 14, 1977 || Nauchnij || N. S. Chernykh || — || align=right | 8.0 km || 
|-id=983 bgcolor=#fefefe
| 4983 Schroeteria ||  ||  || September 11, 1977 || Nauchnij || N. S. Chernykh || — || align=right | 4.9 km || 
|-id=984 bgcolor=#fefefe
| 4984 Patrickmiller ||  ||  || November 7, 1978 || Palomar || E. F. Helin, S. J. Bus || — || align=right | 2.8 km || 
|-id=985 bgcolor=#d6d6d6
| 4985 Fitzsimmons ||  ||  || August 23, 1979 || La Silla || C.-I. Lagerkvist || THM || align=right | 12 km || 
|-id=986 bgcolor=#E9E9E9
| 4986 Osipovia ||  ||  || September 23, 1979 || Nauchnij || N. S. Chernykh || — || align=right | 5.8 km || 
|-id=987 bgcolor=#fefefe
| 4987 Flamsteed ||  ||  || March 20, 1980 || Bickley || Perth Obs. || — || align=right | 5.6 km || 
|-id=988 bgcolor=#fefefe
| 4988 Chushuho ||  ||  || November 6, 1980 || Nanking || Purple Mountain Obs. || NYS || align=right | 3.6 km || 
|-id=989 bgcolor=#E9E9E9
| 4989 Joegoldstein ||  ||  || February 28, 1981 || Siding Spring || S. J. Bus || EUN || align=right | 5.3 km || 
|-id=990 bgcolor=#fefefe
| 4990 Trombka ||  ||  || March 2, 1981 || Siding Spring || S. J. Bus || — || align=right | 4.5 km || 
|-id=991 bgcolor=#d6d6d6
| 4991 Hansuess ||  ||  || March 1, 1981 || Siding Spring || S. J. Bus || EOS || align=right | 9.8 km || 
|-id=992 bgcolor=#E9E9E9
| 4992 Kálmán ||  ||  || October 25, 1982 || Nauchnij || L. V. Zhuravleva || MAR || align=right | 6.5 km || 
|-id=993 bgcolor=#fefefe
| 4993 Cossard || 1983 GR ||  || April 11, 1983 || La Silla || H. Debehogne, G. DeSanctis || V || align=right | 4.6 km || 
|-id=994 bgcolor=#d6d6d6
| 4994 Kisala ||  ||  || September 1, 1983 || La Silla || H. Debehogne || — || align=right | 5.5 km || 
|-id=995 bgcolor=#FA8072
| 4995 Griffin || 1984 QR ||  || August 28, 1984 || Palomar || S. R. Swanson || PHO || align=right | 5.5 km || 
|-id=996 bgcolor=#E9E9E9
| 4996 Veisberg ||  ||  || August 11, 1986 || Nauchnij || L. G. Karachkina || — || align=right | 5.7 km || 
|-id=997 bgcolor=#d6d6d6
| 4997 Ksana || 1986 TM ||  || October 6, 1986 || Nauchnij || L. G. Karachkina || PALTj (2.99) || align=right | 9.9 km || 
|-id=998 bgcolor=#d6d6d6
| 4998 Kabashima || 1986 VG ||  || November 5, 1986 || Toyota || K. Suzuki, T. Urata || EOS || align=right | 16 km || 
|-id=999 bgcolor=#d6d6d6
| 4999 MPC || 1987 CJ ||  || February 2, 1987 || La Silla || E. W. Elst || EOS || align=right | 12 km || 
|-id=000 bgcolor=#E9E9E9
| 5000 IAU ||  ||  || August 23, 1987 || Palomar || E. F. Helin || — || align=right | 4.2 km || 
|}

References

External links 
 Discovery Circumstances: Numbered Minor Planets (1)–(5000) (IAU Minor Planet Center)

0004